= List of electoral wards in Newport, Wales =

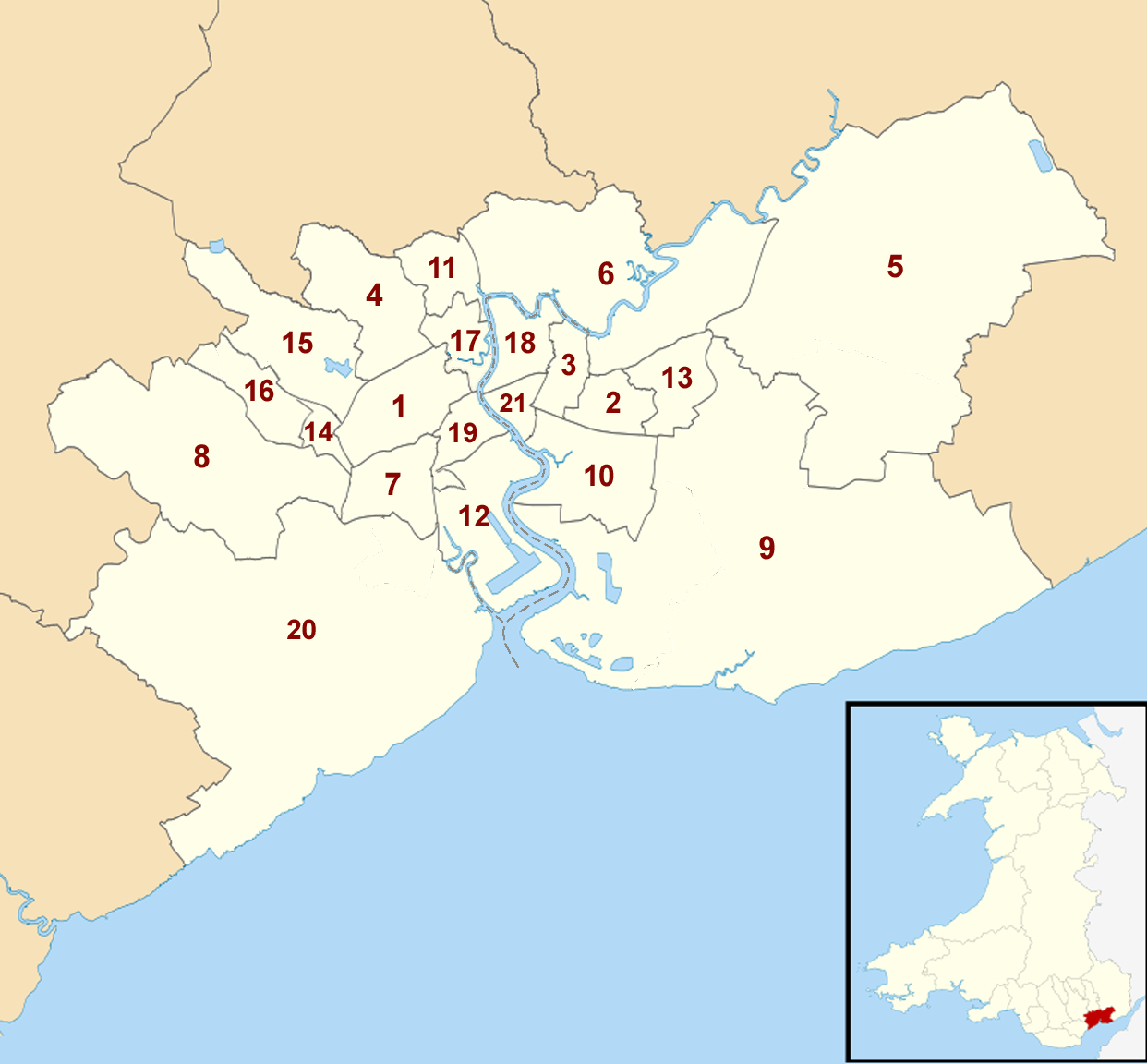
Electoral wards in Newport, numbered alphabetically from 1.Allt-yr-yn to 21.Victoria

This list of electoral wards in Newport includes council wards, which elect councillors to Newport City Council in south Wales. There are also community wards, which elect councillors to community councils.

Since 2022 Newport has been divided into 21 city wards. There are also 14 community councils in the city and county.

== Current wards ==
=== City wards ===
The city is divided into 21 wards, since May 2022 electing 51 councillors. Most of these wards are coterminous with communities (parishes) of the same name. The following table lists city council wards, communities and associated geographical areas. Communities with a community council are indicated with a '*':

Ward		Elected Councillors	Communities (Civil parishes)	Other geographic areas
1	Allt-yr-yn	3	Allt-yr-yn	Ridgeway, Barrack Hill, Glasllwch, Gold Tops
2	Alway	3	Alway	Somerton, Lawrence Hill
3	Beechwood	3	Beechwood	Eveswell
4	Bettws	3	Bettws	
5	Bishton and Langstone	2	Bishton*, Langstone*, Llanvaches*, Penhow*	Llanmartin, Parc Seymour, Wentwood Forest, Coed-y-Caerau, Cat's Ash, Llanbedr, Newport, Llandevaud, Whitebrook
6	Caerleon	3	Caerleon	Christchurch, Bulmore
7	Gaer	3	Gaer	Maesglas, Stelvio, St. Davids
8	Graig	2	Graig*	Rhiwderin, Bassaleg, Lower Machen, Pentre Poeth, Fox Hill
9	Llanwern	1	Llanwern, Goldcliff, Nash*, Redwick, Whitson	
10	Lliswerry	4	Lliswerry	Broadmead Park, Moorland Park, Uskmouth, Broadstreet Common
11	Malpas	3	Malpas	
12	Pillgwenlly	2	Pillgwenlly	Level of Mendalgief
13	Ringland	3	Ringland	Bishpool, Treberth, Coldra
14	Rogerstone East	1	Rogerstone* (part)	High Cross, Cefn Wood, Croesllanfro, Mount Pleasant
15	Rogerstone North	1	Rogerstone* (part)	
16	Rogerstone West	2	Rogerstone* (part)	Afon Village
17	Shaftesbury	2	Shaftesbury	Brynglas, Crindau, Marshes, Blaen-y-pant
18	St. Julian's	3	St. Julian's	Riverside, Barnardtown
19	Stow Hill	2	Stow Hill	St. Woolos, Baneswell, City centre
20	Tredegar Park and Marshfield	3	Tredegar Park, Coedkernew*, Marshfield*, Michaelston-y-Fedw*, Wentlooge*	Duffryn, Castleton, St. Brides, Blacktown, Peterstone
21	Victoria	2	Victoria	Maindee, Summerhill

=== Community council wards ===
There are 14 community councils in Newport.

Community	Community Council	Community wards	Community Councillors
Bishton	Bishston CC	Bishton; Underwood	1; 12
Coedkernew	Coedkernew CC		7
Goldcliff	Goldcliff CC		7
Graig	Graig CC	Bassaleg; Lower Machen; Rhiwderin	9; 1; 5
Langstone	Langstone CC	Langstone; Llanmartin	8; 4
Llanvaches	Llanvaches CC		7
Llanwern	Llanwern CC		7
Marshfield	Marshfield CC		11
Michaelston-y-Fedw	Michaelston-y-Fedw CC		7
Nash	Nash CC		7
Penhow	Penhow CC		8
Redwick	Redwick CC		5
Rogerstone	Rogerstone CC	East; North; West	4; 4; 7
Wentlooge	Wentlooge CC	Peterstone; St Brides	4; 5

== 2022 city ward changes ==
Following a boundary review by the Local Democracy and Boundary Commission for Wales, the overall number of wards increased from 20 to 21, with an overall increase in the number of city councillors from 50 to 51. The changes were effective from the 2022 local elections.

Eleven wards remained unchanged. Of the remainder:

- The community of Bishton was transferred from the Llanwern ward and merged with the Langstone ward, which was renamed Bishton and Langstone.
- The Llanwern ward would lose the community of Bishton but gain the community of Nash from neighbouring Liswerry.
- The Liswerry ward would lose the area of Nash, though retain its four city councillors.
- The area of Afon Village was transferred from the Graig ward to Rogerstone West.
- The Rogerstone ward would be divided into three new wards - Rogerstone East, Rogerstone North and Rogerstone West.
- The Mon Bank development was transferred from the Pillgwenlly ward to Stow Hill.
- The Tredegar Park ward would be merged with the Marshfield ward to become Tredegar Park and Marshfield.

== County borough and city wards 1995–2022 ==
The 20 wards in Newport elected 50 city councillors since the 2004 local elections.

Ward	Councillors 2004–2022	Communities (civil parishes)	Other geographic areas
Allt-yr-yn	3	Allt-yr-yn	Ridgeway, Barrack Hill, Glasllwch, Gold Tops
Alway	3	Alway	Somerton, Lawrence Hill
Beechwood	3	Beechwood	Eveswell
Bettws	3	Bettws	
Caerleon	3	Caerleon	Christchurch, Bulmore
Gaer	3	Gaer	Maesglas, Stelvio, St. Davids
Graig	2	Graig*	Rhiwderin, Bassaleg, Lower Machen, Pentre Poeth, Fox Hill
Langstone	2	Langstone*, Llanvaches*, Penhow*	Llanmartin, Parc Seymour, Wentwood Forest, Coed-y-caerau, Cat's Ash, Llanbedr, Whitebrook
Llanwern	1	Bishton, Goldcliff*, Llanwern*, Redwick*	Underwood, Whitson, Summerleaze, Wilcrick, Saltmarsh, Milton, Porton
Lliswerry	4	Lliswerry, Nash*	Broadmead Park, Moorland Park, Uskmouth, Broadstreet Common
Malpas	3	Malpas	
Marshfield	2	Coedkernew*, Marshfield*, Michaelston-y-Fedw*, Wentlooge*	Castleton, St. Brides, Blacktown, Peterstone
Pillgwenlly	2	Pillgwenlly	Level of Mendalgief
Ringland	3	Ringland	Bishpool, Treberth, Coldra
Rogerstone	3	Rogerstone*	High Cross, Cefn Wood, Croesllanfro, Mount Pleasant
Shaftesbury	2	Shaftesbury	Brynglas, Crindau, Marshes, Blaen-y-pant
St Julian's	3	St. Julian's	Riverside, Barnardtown
Stow Hill	2	Stow Hill	St. Woolos, Baneswell, City centre
Tredegar Park	1	Tredegar Park	Duffryn
Victoria	2	Victoria	Maindee, Summerhill

== See also ==
- List of electoral wards in Wales
