= List of standardised Welsh place-names in Newport =

Location of the county borough of Newport in Wales.

The list of standardised Welsh place-names, for places in Newport, Wales, is a list compiled by the Welsh Language Commissioner to recommend the standardisation of the spelling of Welsh place-names, particularly in the Welsh language and when multiple forms are used, although some place-names in English were also recommended to be matched with the Welsh. The list contains 69 entries, as of November 2023.

The list is based on recommendations provided by the Place-names Standardisation Panel, convened by the Commissioner, for expert advice on the standardisation of Welsh place-names. The panel bases their decisions on a set of guidelines (currently dating to June 2023), specific to Welsh settlement names (such as those of villages, towns, and cities) and topographic features (such as lakes, mountains and rivers). The panel does not cover house or building names, although similar principles could be applied to them or for names for new developments (to which the Commissioner offers their own advice to local authorities and housing developers). The panel may also have used additional guidelines.

The list was first published in 2018, and took years to put together. Upon creation, these lists were published under the Open Government Licence 3.0.

== List ==
Recommended standardised names		Other name/spelling not recommended	Type	Grid reference
Welsh	English	Other name/spelling not recommended	Type	Grid reference
Allteuryn	Goldcliff		Settlement	ST3683
Allt-yr-ynn	Allt-yr-ynn	Allt-yr-yn	Settlement	ST2988
Alway	Alway		Settlement	ST3488
Baneswell	Baneswell		Settlement	ST3087
Barnardtown	Barnardtown		Settlement	ST3188
Barrack Hill	Barrack Hill		Settlement	ST3089
Basaleg	Basaleg	Bassaleg	Settlement	ST2786
Beechwood	Beechwood		Settlement	ST3388
Began	Began		Settlement	ST2283
Betws	Betws	Bettws	Settlement	ST2990
Bishpool	Bishpool		Settlement	ST3488
Broadstreet Common	Broadstreet Common		Settlement	ST3584
Bryn-glas	Bryn-glas	Brynglas	Settlement	ST3089
Caerau Park	Caerau Park		Settlement	ST2987
Caerllion	Caerleon		Settlement	ST3390
Cas-bach	Castleton		Settlement	ST2583
Casnewydd	Newport		Settlement	ST3188
Cats Ash	Cats Ash		Settlement	ST3790
Cemais Isaf	Kemeys Inferior		Settlement	ST3792
Clytha Park	Clytha Park		Settlement	ST3087
Coedcernyw	Coedkernew		Settlement	ST2783
Coedycaerau	Coedycaerau		Settlement	ST3891
Coldra	Coldra		Settlement	ST3589
Crindai	Crindai	Crindau	Settlement	ST3189
Dyffryn	Dyffryn	Duffryn	Settlement	ST2985
Eglwys y Drindod	Christchurch		Settlement	ST3489
Gaer	Gaer		Settlement	ST2986
Gatlas	Gatlas		Settlement	ST3492
Gold Tops	Gold Tops		Settlement	ST3088
High Cross	High Cross		Settlement	ST2888
Langstone	Langstone		Settlement	ST3790
Lawrence Hill	Lawrence Hill		Settlement	ST3488
Llanbedr	Llanbedr	Llanbeder	Settlement	ST3890
Llandevaud	Llandevaud		Settlement	ST4090
Llanfaches	Llanfaches	Llanvaches	Settlement	ST4391
Llanfarthin	Llanmartin		Settlement	ST3989
Llanfihangel-y-fedw	Michaelston-y-fedw	Michaelston-y-Fedw	Settlement	ST2484
Llansanffraid Gwynllŵg	St Brides Wentloog	St. Brides Wentloog	Settlement	ST2982
Llan-wern	Llan-wern	Llanwern	Settlement	ST3688
Llyswyry	Lliswerry		Settlement	ST3487
Machen Isaf	Lower Machen		Settlement	ST2288
Maendy	Maendy	Maindee	Settlement	ST3289
Maerun	Marshfield		Settlement	ST2582
Maes-glas	Maes-glas	Maesglas	Settlement	ST2985
Malpas	Malpas		Settlement	ST3090
Parc Seymour	Parc Seymour	Parc-Seymour	Settlement	ST4091
Pen-hw	Pen-how	Penhow	Settlement	ST4290
Pentre-poeth	Pentre-poeth		Settlement	ST2686
Pilgwenlli	Pillgwenlly		Settlement	ST3187
Pye Corner	Pye Corner		Settlement	ST3485
Redwick	Redwick		Settlement	ST4184
Rhiwderyn	Rhiwderyn	Rhiwderin	Settlement	ST2687
Ridgeway	Ridgeway		Settlement	ST2988
Ringland	Ringland		Settlement	ST3588
Sain Silian	St Julians		Settlement	ST3289
Saltmarsh	Saltmarsh		Settlement	ST3582
Somerton	Somerton		Settlement	ST3387
Stelvio	Stelvio		Settlement	ST2987
Stow Park	Stow Park		Settlement	ST3087
Summer Hill	Summer Hill		Settlement	ST3288
Summerleaze	Summerleaze		Settlement	ST4284
Tre-ddu	Blacktown		Settlement	ST2681
Trefesgob	Bishton		Settlement	ST3987
Trefonnen	Nash		Settlement	ST3483
Tŷ-du	Rogerstone		Settlement	ST2688
Underwood	Underwood		Settlement	ST3888
The Village	The Village		Settlement	ST3490
Whitson	Whitson		Settlement	ST3883
Wilcrick	Wilcrick		Settlement	ST4088
