= Newport City Council =

Local government of Newport, Wales

Newport City Council Cyngor Dinas Casnewydd (Welsh)

Type
- Type: Principal council of Newport, Wales

Leadership
- Mayor: Deb Harvey, Labour since 19 May 2026
- Leader: Dimitri Batrouni, Labour since 21 May 2024
- Chief Executive: Beverly Owen since 28 July 2020

Structure
- Seats: 51 councillors
- Graph of the party split among 51 seats.
- Political groups: Administration (33) Labour (33) Other parties (18) Conservative (6) Newport Ind. (3) Green (2) Liberal Democrats (1) Independent (6)
- Length of term: 5 years

Elections
- Voting system: First-past-the-post
- Last election: 5 May 2022
- Next election: 6 May 2027

Motto
- "Terra Marique" "By land and sea"

Meeting place
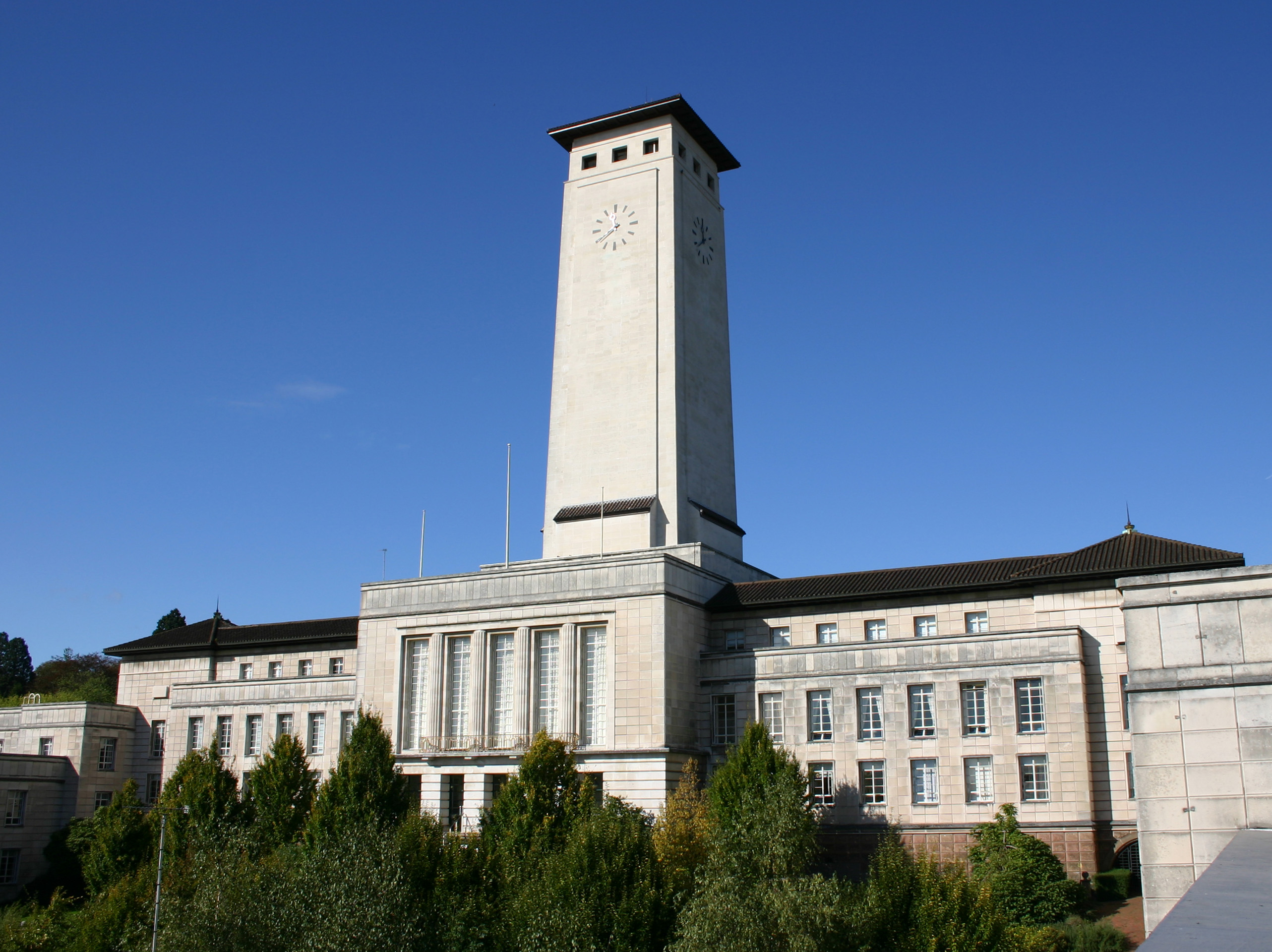
- Newport Civic Centre, Godfrey Road, Newport, NP20 4UR

Website
- www.newport.gov.uk

Newport City Council (Welsh: Cyngor Dinas Casnewydd) is the local authority for Newport, one of the principal areas of Wales. Newport has had a council since at least the 14th century, which has been reformed and had its territory enlarged on numerous occasions. Since 1996 it has been a county borough council. In 2002 it changed its name from Newport County Borough Council to Newport City Council when Newport was awarded city status. It consists of 51 councillors, who represent the city's 20 wards. The council is based at Newport Civic Centre. It has been under Labour majority control since 2012.

== History ==
Newport was an ancient mesne borough, occupying an important position on the Welsh Marches. The town grew up around Newport Castle, which was built early in the 12th century. Giraldus Cambrensis, writing in 1187, calls it Novus Burgus, probably to distinguish it from Caerleon, whose prosperity declined as that of Newport increased. The first lord was Robert Fitzhamon, who died in 1107, and from him the lordship passed to the Earls of Gloucester and Stafford and the Dukes of Buckingham. Hugh le Despenser, who held the lordship for a short time, obtained in 1323 a charter of liberties for the burgesses, granting them freedom from toll throughout England, Ireland and Aquitaine. Hugh, Earl of Stafford granted a further charter in 1385, confirmed by his grandson in 1427, which gave the burgesses the right of self-government and of a merchant gild. On the attainder of the Duke of Buckingham in 1483 the lordship lapsed to the crown, of whom it was held in the 16th and 17th centuries by the Pembrokes, and in the 19th by the Beauforts.

The town was incorporated by Royal Charter of James I in 1623 and confirmed by Charles II in 1685. This created a corporation which consisted of the Mayor of Newport and twelve aldermen who governed the borough and were responsible for law and order. They were assisted by a recorder and two bailiffs. This system of government lasted in essence until the town was reformed as a municipal borough in 1836 under the Municipal Corporations Act 1835. This reconstituted the corporation as an elected borough council, comprising a mayor, aldermen and councillors. The Newport Borough Police was also formed in 1836.

In 1934 the borough was enlarged by taking in parts of the surrounding parishes of St Woolos, Christchurch, Malpas and Bettws.

When elected county councils were established in 1889 under the Local Government Act 1888, Newport was included in the administrative county of Monmouthshire, being governed by Monmouthshire County Council, which chose to base itself in Newport. Just over two years later, on 7 November 1891, Newport was one of the first places to become a county borough (other than those which had been created directly by the 1888 act), making it administratively independent from Monmouthshire County Council.

Newport Civic Centre, designed by architect Thomas Cecil Howitt, was completed in 1964 to serve as the council's headquarters.

Further local government reorganisation in 1974 saw the abolition of county boroughs. Newport became a lower-tier district with borough status. The reformed borough covered a larger area than the former county borough, covering the whole of two former districts and most of a third, which were abolished at the same time:

- Caerleon Urban District
- Magor and St Mellons Rural District, except Henllys (which went to Torfaen) and St Mellons (which went to Cardiff)
- Newport County Borough

The enlarged borough had an area of 46,976 acres (19,011 ha), and was governed by both Newport Borough Council and Gwent County Council. In 1996, another wave of local-government reorganisation reverted the council to its previous status of a self-governing county borough, taking over the functions of the abolished Gwent County Council in the area. In 2002 Newport was granted formal city status as part of a contest for the Queen's Golden Jubilee in 2002, in which one Welsh town was eligible to be awarded city status.

== Political control ==
The council has been under Labour majority control since 2012.

The first election to the council following the Local Government Act 1972 was held in 1973, initially operating as a shadow authority until the reforms under that act took effect on 1 April 1974. Political control of the council since 1974 has been as follows:

Lower-tier borough

Party in control	Years
Labour	1974–1976
Conservative	1976–1979
Labour	1979–1996

County borough

Party in control	Years
Labour	1996–2008
No overall control	2008–2012
Labour	2012–present

=== Leadership ===
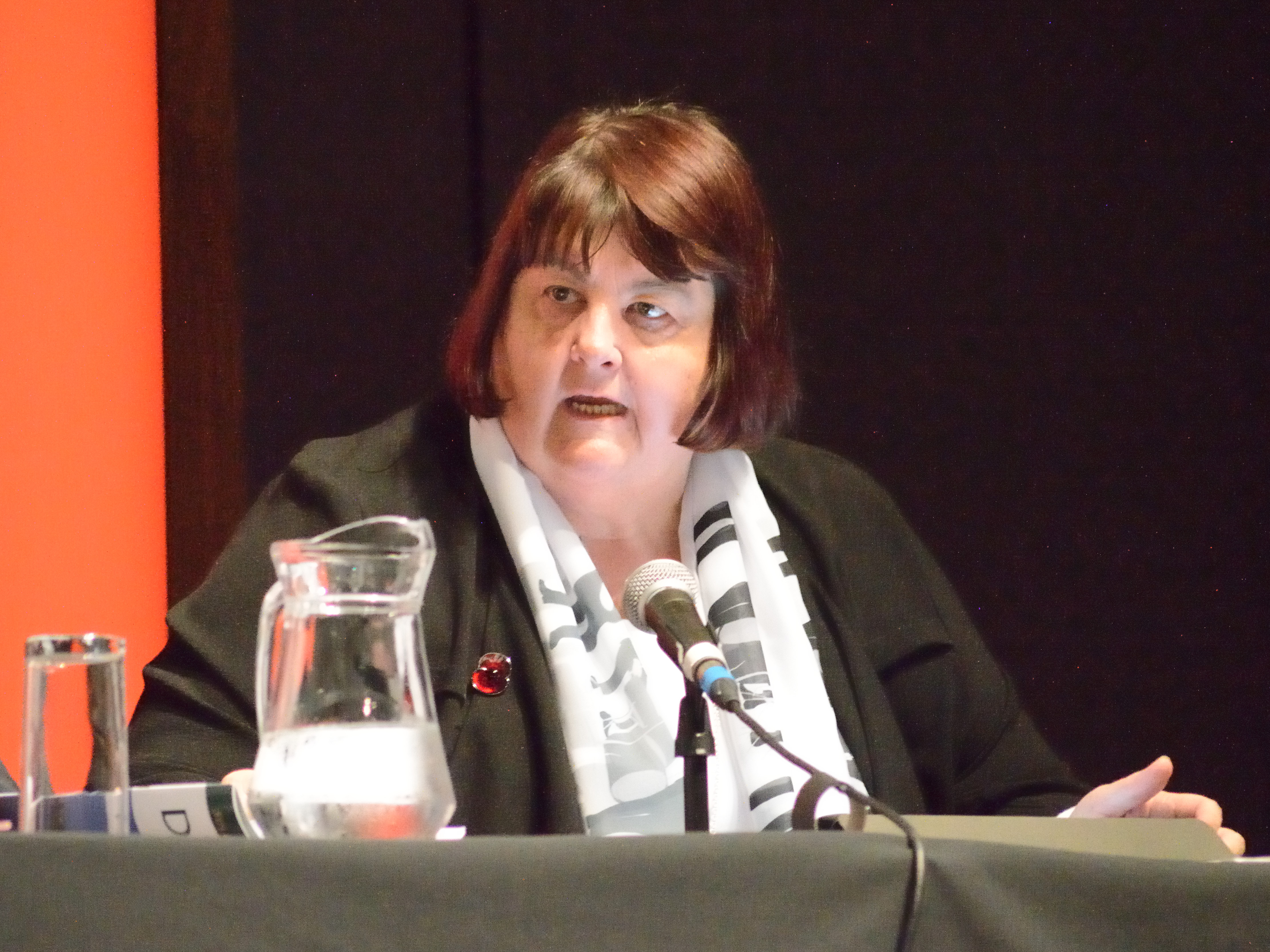
Debbie Wilcox, Baroness Wilcox of Newport, Newport City Council leader from 2016 to 2019

The role of Mayor of Newport is largely ceremonial. Political leadership is instead provided by the leader of the council. The leaders since 2004 have been:

Councillor	Party	From	To
Bob Bright	Labour	2004	2008
Matthew Evans	Conservative	2008	2012
Bob Bright	Labour	May 2012	Apr 2016
Debbie Wilcox	Labour	17 May 2016	26 Nov 2019
Jane Mudd	Labour	26 Nov 2019	21 May 2024
Dimitri Batrouni	Labour	21 May 2024	

=== Composition ===
Following the 2022 election and subsequent changes up to October 2026, the composition of the council was:

Party	Seats
Labour	33
Conservative	6
Newport Independents Party	3
Green	2
Liberal Democrats	1
Independent	6
Total	51

Immediately after the 2022 election, the councillors and their parties (with re-elected councillors in bold) were:

Group affiliation	Current Representatives	Members
**Labour**	Saeed Adan; **Miqdad Al-Nuaimi**; Dimitri Batrouni; Paul Bright; Emma Corten; Claire Baker-Westhead; **James Clarke**; **Paul Cockeram**; Steve Cocks; Bev Davies; **Deb Davies**; Pat Drewett; **Yvonne Forsey**; **Debbie Harvey**; Tim Harvey; John Harris; Gavin Horton; **Phil Hourahine**; **Jason Hughes**; Farzina Hussain; Rhian Howells; Debbie Jenkins; **Laura Lacey**; **Malcolm Linton**; **Stephen Marshall**; **David Mayer**; **Jane Mudd**; Bev Perkins; Alex Pimm; Matthew Pimm; John Reynolds; Allan Screen; **Mark Spencer**; **Kate Thomas**; **Trevor Watkins**	35
Conservative	**Matthew Evans**; **David Fouweather**; John Jones; **Martyn Kellaway**; **Ray Mogford**; Chris Reeks; **William Routley**	7
Independent	Mark Howells; **Alan Morris**; James Pearson; Andrew Sterry	4
Newport Ind.	**Janet Cleverly**; **Jason Jordan**; **Kevin Whitehead**	3
Green	Lauren James	1
Liberal Democrats	**Carmel Townsend**	1
Total		51

== Elections ==
Elections take place every five years. The last election was held on 5 May 2022.

In March 2017 a new political party, the Newport Independents Party, was formed to field candidates in the May 2017 election. It won four seats.

Year	Seats	Labour	Conservative	Liberal Democrats	Plaid Cymru	Independent	Newport Independents	Green	Notes
1995	47	46	1	0	0	0	-	0	Labour majority control
1999	47	40	5	0	0	2	-	0	Labour majority control
2004	50	31	11	6	1	1	-	0	Labour majority control. New ward boundaries.
2008	50	22	17	9	1	1	-	0	No overall control; Conservative-Liberal Democrat coalition.
2012	50	37	10	1	0	2	-	0	Labour majority control
2017	50	31	12	2	0	1	4	0	Labour majority control
2022	51	35	7	1	0	4	3	1	Labour majority control. New ward boundaries.

Party with the most elected councillors in bold. Coalition agreements in notes column.

The next election is due in 2027.

== Wards ==
Pre-2022 electoral wards in Newport

The city is divided into 21 wards, since May 2022 electing 51 councillors. Most of these wards are coterminous with communities (parishes) of the same name. Each community can have an elected council. The following table lists city council wards, communities and associated geographical areas. Communities with a community council are indicated with a '*':

Ward	Elected Councillors	Communities (Parishes)	Other geographic areas
Allt-yr-yn	3	Allt-yr-yn	Ridgeway, Barrack Hill, Glasllwch, Gold Tops
Alway	3	Alway	Somerton, Lawrence Hill
Beechwood	3	Beechwood	Eveswell
Bettws	3	Bettws	
Bishton and Langstone	2	Bishton*, Langstone*, Llanvaches*, Penhow*	Llanmartin, Parc Seymour, Wentwood Forest, Coed-y-Caerau, Cat's Ash, Llanbedr, Whitebrook
Caerleon	3	Caerleon	Christchurch, Bulmore
Gaer	3	Gaer	Maesglas, Stelvio, St. Davids
Graig	2	Graig*	Rhiwderin, Bassaleg, Lower Machen, Pentre Poeth, Fox Hill
Llanwern	1	Llanwern, Goldcliff, Whitson, Redwick	
Lliswerry	4	Lliswerry, Nash*	Broadmead Park, Moorland Park, Uskmouth, Broadstreet Common
Malpas	3	Malpas	
Pillgwenlly	2	Pillgwenlly	Level of Mendalgief
Ringland	3	Ringland	Bishpool, Treberth, Coldra
Rogerstone East	1	Rogerstone*	High Cross, Cefn Wood, Croesllanfro, Mount Pleasant
Rogerstone North	1		
Rogerstone West	2		Afon Village
Shaftesbury	2	Shaftesbury	Brynglas, Crindau, Marshes, Blaen-y-pant
St Julians	3	St Julians	Riverside, Barnardtown
Stow Hill	2	Stow Hill	St. Woolos, Baneswell, City centre
Tredegar Park and Marshfield	3	Tredegar Park, Coedkernew*, Marshfield*, Michaelston-y-Fedw*, Wentlooge*	Duffryn, Castleton, St. Brides, Blacktown, Peterstone
Victoria	2	Victoria	Maindee, Summerhill
Total Seats	51		

== Sites ==
- Newport Civic Centre
- Mansion House

== In the news ==
In October 2013, the controversial demolition of a 35-metre long Chartist Mural reached national attention. The 35-year-old mural commemorated Newport's Chartist history, specifically the Newport Rising of 1839. The Guardian suggested it was "not just budgets, but a collective cultural history that's under attack.". A spokesman for the council stated that the mural "has served to remind us of Newport’s past, but we must now focus on Newport’s future." Actor Michael Sheen helped to found a trust, to commission a new memorial, with £50,000 of funding provided by Newport City Council. A smaller replica of the mural, in four panels, was unveiled on 4 November 2019, exactly 180 years since the Chartist uprising. It was created by Oliver Budd, son of the original mural's creator, Kenneth Budd. The panels are located on Cefn Road, Rogerstone, and include an information board telling the history of Chartism.

It was announced in July 2019 that Council Chief Executive Will Godfrey would be resigning in early October after six years to take over at Bath and North East Somerset Council. The Council have stated that as of September 2019, more time is needed to find a replacement, and that an interim CEO will be in place for six to twelve months.

The Council instructed the operators of new "pod" accommodation for homeless people in the city to take down the facilities August 2019 until they were subject to safety inspections and certification.

In September 2019 the council were criticised for delays in arranging school transport for those attending the independent Priory College South Wales at Coleg Gwent in Pontypool.

The Council were reported in September 2019 as being involved in a new trial with Sustrans Cymru, aimed at improving safety outside city primary schools through use of temporary barriers, road and pavement painting, and temporary school crossings.

In September 2019 the Council's then leader Debbie Wilcox was announced as a Labour life peer as part of Theresa May's 2019 Prime Minister's Resignation Honours. She confirmed later that month that she would be stepping down as Leader of the Council, with a successor to be named.

The Council announced in September 2019 that the city's Market Arcade would be closed due to anti-social behaviour, after the Council secured a Public Spaces Protection order to take effect daily from 8pm until 7am. The move came after complaints about city centre drug abuse, property damage, and noise.

In 2019 the Council received £4m in Welsh Government funds to pursue a footbridge replacement over Newport railway station, connecting Devon Place and Queensway. The footbridge opened to the public in April of 2023 increasing access to the city centre.
