= 2004 Newport City Council election =

2004 Welsh local government election

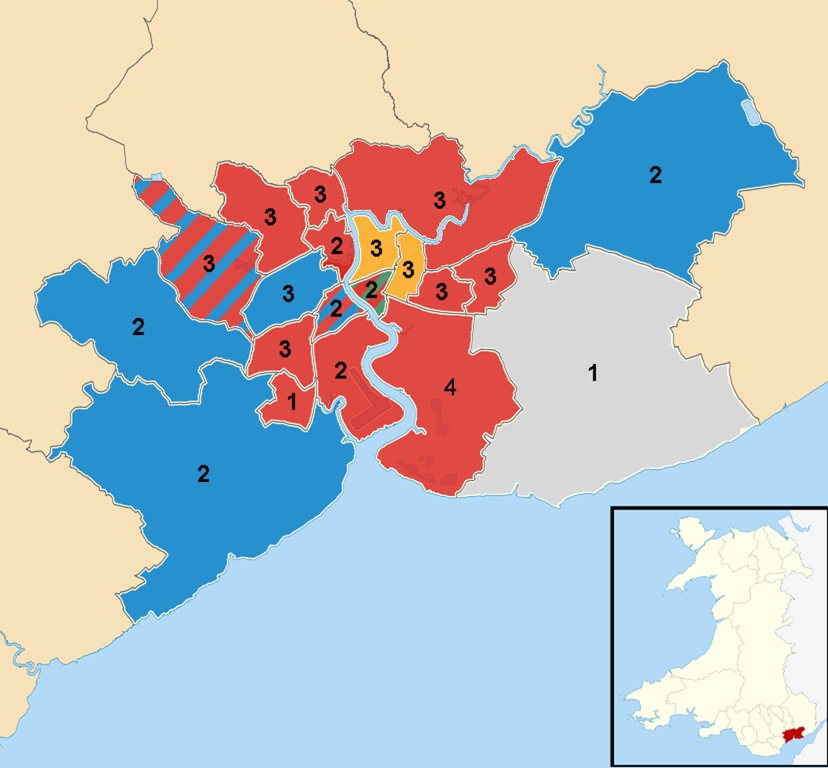
2004 election results map, showing numbers of councillors per ward and their party affiliations

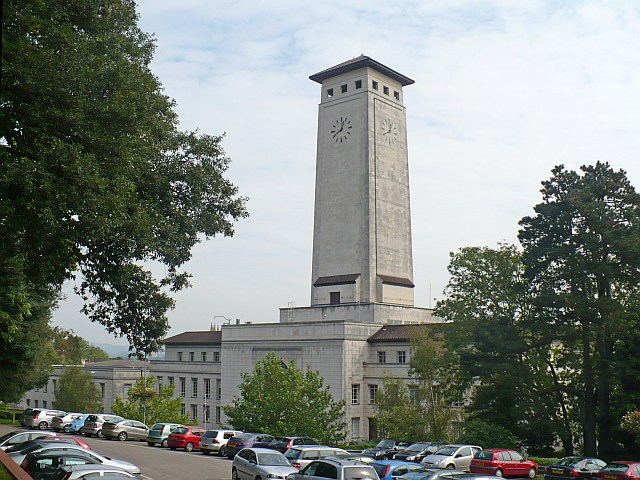
Newport Civic Centre

2004 Elections to Newport City Council were held on 10 June 2004 along with elections to the other 21 local authorities and community councils in Wales, as well as elections in the remainder of the United Kingdom. It was the first full election in Newport since it was awarded city status in 2002.

The 50 councillors elected in this election served a four-year term.

The previous election took place in 1999.

The next full election took place in May 2008.

== Background ==
Newport County Borough was awarded city status in 2002, which also changed the status of the council (though the results were still reported as Newport County Borough at this election).

Following an electoral review there were a number of ward boundary changes and the number of elected councillors increased from 47 to 50, effective from the 2004 election.

== Election results: overview ==
Newport City Council election 2004
Party	Seats	Gains	Losses	Net gain/loss	Seats %	Votes %	Votes	+/−
Labour	31			▼6	62.0			
Conservative	11			▲5	22.0			
Liberal Democrats	6			▲5	12.0			
Plaid Cymru	1			0	2.0		3,654	
Independent	1			▼1	2.0			
Total	50							

== Ward results ==
Asterixes denote sitting councillors for the ward who are standing for re-election.

=== Allt-yr-yn ===
Allt-yr-yn (3 seats)
Party	Candidate	Votes	%	±%
Conservative	Matthew Evans *	1,645		
Conservative	David Fouweather	1,576		
Conservative	Leslie Knight *	1,520		
Labour	Geoffrey Lee	804		
Labour	Victoria Colley-Wall	750		
Labour	Alan Jones	705		
Liberal Democrats	Megan Rees Webb	474		
Liberal Democrats	David Watts	448		
Liberal Democrats	Charles Williams	438		
Plaid Cymru	Clive Busson	257		
Turnout				

=== Alway ===
Alway (3 seats)
Party	Candidate	Votes	%	±%
Labour	Raymond Truman *	853		
Labour	John Guy *	806		
Labour	Ken Powell *	796		
Conservative	Mary Thomas	412		
Conservative	Alison Aston	403		
Conservative	Philip Aston	401		
Liberal Democrats	Anne Parry	399		
Plaid Cymru	Dawn Bennett	221		
Turnout				

=== Beechwood ===
Beechwood (3 seats)
Party	Candidate	Votes	%	±%
Liberal Democrats	Hugh Clarke *	1,521		
Liberal Democrats	David Hando	1,422		
Liberal Democrats	Jeff Evans	1,337		
Labour	Christine Watkins	608		
Labour	Helen Kinsey	602		
Labour	Jane Eden	595		
Conservative	Anthony Bees	272		
Conservative	Justine Hennah	269		
Conservative	Kathleen Davies	251		
Turnout				

=== Bettws ===
Bettws (3 seats)
Party	Candidate	Votes	%	±%
Labour	Noel Trigg *	1,150		
Labour	Val Delahaye *	754		
Labour	Glyn Jarvis *	660		
Independent	Susan Baker	539		
Independent	John Parris	483		
Conservative	Paula-Jane Fouweather	178		
Liberal Democrats	Kevin Rice	159		
Plaid Cymru	Alison Cording	156		
Turnout				

=== Caerleon ===
Caerleon (3 seats)
Party	Candidate	Votes	%	±%
Labour	Gail Giles	1,095		
Labour	Paul Huntley	1,045		
Labour	Cliff Suller	1,039		
Caerleon I. P. P.	Adam Cox *	1,016		
Caerleon I. P. P.	Naomi Macey *	995		
Caerleon I. P. P.	Stephen Macey	826		
Conservative	William Fisher	642		
Conservative	David Hildred	569		
Conservative	Alan Routley	566		
Liberal Democrats	Peter Davies	354		
Turnout				

Cox, Macey and Macey stood for the Caerleon Independent Progressive Party at this election. Adam Cox and Naomi Macey had been elected for the Liberal Democrats at the 1999 election.

=== Gaer ===
Gaer (3 seats)
Party	Candidate	Votes	%	±%
Labour	Mark Whitcutt *	1,042		
Labour	Herbert Thomas	898		
Labour	Deborah Wilcox	878		
Liberal Democrats	James Wood	624		
Liberal Democrats	Mark Wheeldon	599		
Liberal Democrats	Nigel Flanagan	588		
Conservative	John Luckett	576		
Conservative	Laura Morgan	539		
Conservative	Brian Jelf	521		
Turnout				

=== Graig ===
Graig (2 seats)
Party	Candidate	Votes	%	±%
Conservative	Margaret Cornelious *	1,030		
Conservative	Dean Jenkins	798		
Labour	Peter McKim *	626		
Labour	Neil Todd	577		
Liberal Democrats	Norman Mountain	348		
Turnout				

=== Langstone ===
Langstone (2 seats)
Party	Candidate	Votes	%	±%
Conservative	David Atwell *	1,114		
Conservative	Simon Lane	1,018		
Liberal Democrats	Ian Barker	274		
Labour	Stephen Chandler	155		
Labour	Steve Clarke	143		
Plaid Cymru	Sheila Cavendish	91		
Turnout				

=== Liswerry ===
Liswerry (4 seats)
Party	Candidate	Votes	%	±%
Labour	Ken Critchley *	1,162		
Labour	Andrew Jeavons	1,120		
Labour	John Richards	964		
Labour	Allan Morris	929		
Conservative	Wayne Marsh	667		
Conservative	Louise Gridland	618		
Conservative	Donna Stagg	563		
Conservative	David Cox	559		
Liberal Democrats	Lucy Townsend	502		
Turnout				

=== Llanwern ===
Llanwern (1 seat)
Party	Candidate	Votes	%	±%
Independent	Carole Atwell *	327		
Labour	Gillian Burton	259		
Conservative	John Small	248		
Plaid Cymru	Theresa Combstock	77		
Liberal Democrats	Carmel Townsend	38		
Turnout				

=== Malpas ===
Malpas (3 seats)
Party	Candidate	Votes	%	±%
Labour	William Langsford *	1,163		
Labour	David Mayer *	1,020		
Labour	Peter Davies	1,000		
Conservative	John Bird	922		
Conservative	Ian Brown	861		
Conservative	Nicholas Richardson	838		
Liberal Democrats	Susan Davies	406		
Plaid Cymru	David Hall	267		
Plaid Cymru	Wendy Hall	236		
Turnout				

=== Marshfield ===
Marshfield (2 seats)
Party	Candidate	Votes	%	±%
Conservative	William Pursey	809		
Conservative	William Morgan	787		
Labour	Anthony Boswell *	590		
Labour	Joe Chiummo	333		
Plaid Cymru	Nathan Brown	170		
Turnout				

=== Pillgwenlly ===
Pillgwenlly (2 seats)
Party	Candidate	Votes	%	±%
Labour	Ron Jones *	673		
Labour	Laura Buchanan-Smith *	582		
Plaid Cymru	Anthony Salkeld	498		
Independent	Reginald Williams	294		
Liberal Democrats	Julia Varley	233		
Turnout				

=== Ringland ===
Ringland (3 seats)
Party	Candidate	Votes	%	±%
Labour	Malcolm Linton	702		
Labour	Bob Bright *	628		
Labour	Tony Gray *	603		
Liberal Democrats	Jeremy Townsend	459		
Plaid Cymru	Leslie Morgan	294		
Turnout				

=== Rogerstone ===
Rogerstone (3 seats)
Party	Candidate	Votes	%	±%
Labour	Edward Burke *	1,515		
Labour	Erryl Heath *	1,389		
Conservative	Stephen Jones	1,375		
Conservative	Andrew Cooksey	1,265		
Conservative	Alan Mazey	1,214		
Labour	Gareth Loudon	1,194		
Liberal Democrats	Paul Angeli	614		
Plaid Cymru	Firdaus Asghar	310		
Turnout				

=== St Julians ===
St Julians (3 seats)
Party	Candidate	Votes	%	±%
Liberal Democrats	Ed Townsend	1,718		
Liberal Democrats	Veronica Watkins	1,560		
Liberal Democrats	Patricia Bull	1,548		
Labour	Ken Goodger	774		
Labour	Paul Bright	632		
Labour	Ian Jones	469		
Conservative	Margaret Palfrey	312		
Independent	Christopher Hill	306		
Conservative	Yale Bryan	277		
Conservative	Christopher Hill	257		
Independent	James Dyer	170		
Plaid Cymru	Jonathan Blackwood	147		
Turnout				

=== Shaftesbury ===
Shaftesbury (2 seats)
Party	Candidate	Votes	%	±%
Labour	Paul Cockeram *	593		
Labour	Robert Poole *	557		
Conservative	Peter Davies	314		
Conservative	Jonathan Hill	310		
Independent	Sheila Goff	276		
Plaid Cymru	Jonathan Clark	215		
Liberal Democrats	Andrew Bailey	192		
Turnout				

=== Stow Hill ===
Stow Hill (2 seats)
Party	Candidate	Votes	%	±%
Conservative	Peter Davies	524		
Labour	Miqdad al-Nuaimi *	441		
Conservative	William Routley	425		
Labour	Alan Wood	382		
Liberal Democrats	Jeffrey North	178		
Plaid Cymru	Rhys ab Elis	126		
Independent	Barbara Powrie	119		
Turnout				

=== Tredegar Park ===
Tredegar Park (one seat)
Party	Candidate	Votes	%	±%
Labour	Trevor Watkins	274		
Plaid Cymru	James Brunnock	254		
Conservative	Paul Jinks	110		
Turnout				

=== Victoria ===
Victoria (2 seats)
Party	Candidate	Votes	%	±%
Plaid Cymru	Mohammad Asghar	571		
Labour	Christine Jenkins	561		
Labour	Harry Williams *	511		
Plaid Cymru	Trefor Puw	459		
Liberal Democrats	Philip Mellish	286		
Liberal Democrats	Doris Mellish	282		
Turnout				

Asghar became Wales' first Muslim councillor when he was elected for this ward.
