= 2022 Newport City Council election =

Local election in Wales

- 5 May 2022

All 51 seats to Newport City Council 26 seats needed for a majority

| | First party | Second party | Third party |
|---|---|---|---|
| Party | Labour | Conservative | Independent |
| Seats won | 35 | 7 | 4 |
| Seat change | ▲4 | ▼5 | ▲3 |
| Popular vote | 44,892 | 25,928 | 6,769 |
| Percentage | 49.1% | 28.3% | 7.4% |
| Swing | ▲13.0pp | ▼3.7pp | ▲4.4pp |
| | Fourth party | Fifth party | Sixth party |
| Party | Newport Ind. | Liberal Democrats | Green |
| Seats won | 3 | 1 | 1 |
| Seat change | ▼1 | ▼1 | ▲1 |
| Popular vote | 4,198 | 7,314 | 1,621 |
| Percentage | 4.6% | 8.0% | 1.8% |
| Swing | ▼5.6pp | ▼1.4pp | ▼0.1pp |
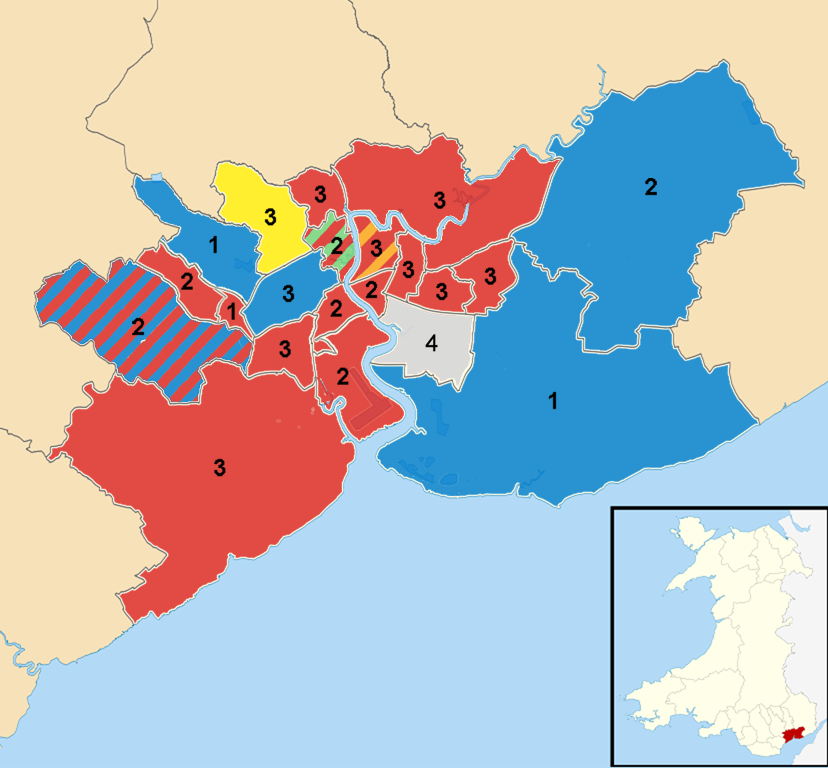
- 2022 election results map, showing numbers of councillors per ward and their party affiliations

The 2022 Newport City Council election was held on 5 May 2022 along with elections to the other 21 local authorities in Wales, community council elections in Wales and 2022 United Kingdom local elections. The previous full council election took place in May 2017, though there had also been a number of by-elections in the city in the intervening period.

== Background ==
The Labour Party had controlled Newport since 2012 and the Liberal Democrats, Conservatives and independents were hoping to make some inroads at this election.

Following an electoral boundary review, the overall number of electoral wards increased from 20 to 21, with the total number of councillors increasing by one, from 50 to 51. The former Rogerstone ward was split into three while the Tredegar Park and Marshfield ward were merged. The Langstone, Llanwern and Lliswerry wards were substantially reconfigured.

== Results summary ==
2022 Newport City Council election
| Party | Seats | Gains | Losses | Net gain/loss | Seats % | Votes % | Votes | +/− |
|---|---|---|---|---|---|---|---|---|
| Labour | 35 | | | ▲4 | 68.6 | 49.1 | 44,892 | +13.0 |
| Conservative | 7 | | | ▼5 | 13.7 | 28.3 | 25,928 | -3.7 |
| Independent | 4 | | | ▲3 | 7.8 | 7.4 | 6,769 | +4.4 |
| Newport Ind. | 3 | | | ▼1 | 5.9 | 4.6 | 4,198 | -5.6 |
| Liberal Democrats | 1 | | | ▼1 | 2.0 | 8.0 | 7,314 | -1.4 |
| Green | 1 | | | ▲1 | 2.0 | 1.8 | 1,621 | -0.1 |
| Plaid Cymru | 0 | | | 0 | 0.0 | 0.5 | 485 | -3.6 |
| Propel | 0 | | | 0 | 0.0 | 0.3 | 281 | New |

== Ward results ==
An asterix indicates the candidate is a sitting councillor for the ward standing for re-election.

=== Allt-yr-yn ===
Allt-yr-yn
| Party | Candidate | Votes | % | ±% |
|---|---|---|---|---|
| Labour | Pat Drewett | 1,366 | 47.7 | |
| Conservative | Matthew Evans * | 1,324 | 46.2 | |
| Conservative | David Fouweather * | 1,253 | 43.7 | |
| Conservative | Charles Ferris * | 1,216 | 42.4 | |
| Labour | Joshua Worrad | 1,130 | 39.4 | |
| Labour | Ibrahim Hayat | 1,123 | 39.2 | |
| Green | Christian Schmidt | 348 | 12.1 | |
| Plaid Cymru | Jonathan Clark | 334 | 11.7 | |
| Liberal Democrats | Karl Mudd | 191 | 6.7 | |
| Liberal Democrats | Roisin Stallard | 164 | 5.7 | |
| Liberal Democrats | Rabeya Sharmin | 147 | 5.1 | |
| Turnout | | | 43.0 | |
| Labour gain from Conservative | | | | |
| Conservative hold | | | | |
| Conservative hold | | | | |

=== Alway ===
Alway
| Party | Candidate | Votes | % | ±% |
|---|---|---|---|---|
| Labour | Debbie Harvey * | 996 | 73.6 | |
| Labour | Tim Harvey | 897 | 66.3 | |
| Labour | Alex Pimm | 884 | 65.3 | |
| Conservative | Kerry Ballard | 453 | 33.5 | |
| Conservative | Paul Mainwaring | 405 | 29.9 | |
| Liberal Democrats | Harry Petty | 255 | 18.8 | |
| Liberal Democrats | Shihan Uddin | 198 | 14.6 | |
| Turnout | | | 26.5 | |
| Labour hold | | | | |
| Labour hold | | | | |
| Labour hold | | | | |

=== Beechwood ===
Beechwood
| Party | Candidate | Votes | % | ±% |
|---|---|---|---|---|
| Labour | Deb Davies * | 1,113 | 69.4 | |
| Labour | Matthew Pimm | 1,030 | 64.2 | |
| Labour | Mark Spencer * | 1,006 | 62.7 | |
| Liberal Democrats | Holly Townsend | 418 | 26.1 | |
| Liberal Democrats | Jeff Evans | 363 | 22.6 | |
| Conservative | Mary Shwartz | 337 | 21.0 | |
| Conservative | Saeed Zafar | 286 | 17.8 | |
| Liberal Democrats | Harun Rashid | 260 | 16.2 | |
| Turnout | | | 31.8 | |
| Labour hold | | | | |
| Labour hold | | | | |
| Labour hold | | | | |

=== Bettws ===
Bettws
| Party | Candidate | Votes | % | ±% |
|---|---|---|---|---|
| Newport Ind. | Kevin Whitehead * | 673 | 52.5 | |
| Newport Ind. | Janet Cleverly * | 633 | 49.4 | |
| Newport Ind. | Jason Jordan * | 594 | 46.4 | |
| Labour | Neil Griffiths | 528 | 41.2 | |
| Labour | Orhan Aksoy | 487 | 38.0 | |
| Labour | Coral Houtman | 460 | 35.9 | |
| Conservative | Carolyn Foster | 164 | 12.8 | |
| Conservative | Paula Fouweather | 157 | 12.3 | |
| Conservative | Denise Hall | 148 | 11.6 | |
| Turnout | | | 24.6 | |
| Newport Ind. hold | | | | |
| Newport Ind. hold | | | | |
| Newport Ind. hold | | | | |

=== Bishton and Langstone ===
Bishton and Langstone
| Party | Candidate | Votes | % |
|---|---|---|---|
| Conservative | William Routley | 1,052 | 59.7 |
| Conservative | Ray Mogford | 1,042 | 59.1 |
| Labour | Julie Hando | 580 | 32.9 |
| Labour | Andrew Bettridge | 530 | 30.1 |
| Liberal Democrats | Sian Townsend | 194 | 11.0 |
| Liberal Democrats | Md Ahmed | 125 | 7.1 |
| Turnout | | | 33.7 |
| Conservative win (new seat) | | | |
| Conservative win (new seat) | | | |

Routley and Mogford had been the sitting councillors for the former Langstone ward, which had the Bishton community added at this election.

=== Caerleon ===
Caerleon
| Party | Candidate | Votes | % | ±% |
|---|---|---|---|---|
| Labour | Jason Hughes * | 1,334 | 53.7 | |
| Labour | Claire Baker-Westhead | 1,271 | 51.2 | |
| Labour | Steve Cocks | 1,200 | 48.3 | |
| Conservative | Joan Watkins * | 1,141 | 45.9 | |
| Conservative | Huw Davies | 1,051 | 42.3 | |
| Conservative | Harry Weeks | 1,034 | 41.6 | |
| Liberal Democrats | Paul L'Allier | 228 | 9.2 | |
| Liberal Democrats | Belayet Khan | 192 | 7.7 | |
| Turnout | | | 41.0 | |
| Labour hold | | | | |
| Labour hold | | | | |
| Labour gain from Conservative | | | | |

=== Gaer ===
Gaer
| Party | Candidate | Votes | % | ±% |
|---|---|---|---|---|
| Labour | Stephen Marshall * | 1,199 | 63.8 | |
| Labour | Bev Perkins | 1,145 | 60.9 | |
| Labour | Dimitri Batrouni | 1,106 | 58.9 | |
| Conservative | Nicholas Clark | 709 | 37.7 | |
| Conservative | Lloyd Walsh | 646 | 34.4 | |
| Conservative | Jay Shwartz | 587 | 31.2 | |
| Liberal Democrats | Anamul Hossain | 246 | 13.1 | |
| Turnout | | | 31.1 | |
| Labour hold | | | | |
| Labour hold | | | | |
| Labour hold | | | | |

=== Graig ===
Graig
| Party | Candidate | Votes | % | ±% |
|---|---|---|---|---|
| Conservative | John Jones | 657 | 43.6 | |
| Labour | John Harris | 654 | 43.4 | |
| Labour | Kath Hopkins | 651 | 43.2 | |
| Conservative | David Williams* | 639 | 42.4 | |
| Liberal Democrats | Nathan Tarr | 415 | 27.5 | |
| Turnout | | | 40.3 | |
| Conservative hold | | | | |
| Labour gain from Conservative | | | | |

=== Llanwern ===
Llanwern
| Party | Candidate | Votes | % | ±% |
|---|---|---|---|---|
| Conservative | Martyn Kellaway * | 658 | 63.8 | |
| Labour | Abul Chowdhury | 313 | 30.4 | |
| Liberal Democrats | Colleen Kennard-Smith | 60 | 5.8 | |
| Turnout | | | | |
| Conservative hold | | Swing | | |

=== Lliswerry ===
Lliswerry
| Party | Candidate | Votes | % | ±% |
|---|---|---|---|---|
| Independent | Allan Morris * | 1,723 | | |
| Independent | Andrew Sterry | 1,623 | | |
| Independent | Mark Howells | 1,616 | | |
| Independent | James Peterson | 1,564 | | |
| Labour | Roger Jeavons * | 902 | | |
| Labour | John Richards * | 864 | | |
| Labour | Shah Alom | 848 | | |
| Labour | Ruqia Hayat | 833 | | |
| Conservative | Luke Thompson | 284 | | |
| Turnout | | | | |
| Independent hold | | | | |
| Independent gain from Labour | | | | |
| Independent gain from Labour | | | | |
| Independent gain from Labour | | | | |

The community of Nash was transferred from Liswerry to the Llanwern ward at this election.

=== Malpas ===
Malpas
| Party | Candidate | Votes | % | ±% |
|---|---|---|---|---|
| Labour | Jane Mudd * | 978 | 48.8 | |
| Labour | James Clarke * | 933 | 46.5 | |
| Labour | David Mayer * | 867 | 43.2 | |
| Conservative | Michael Brunnock | 745 | 37.1 | |
| Conservative | Stephen Manley | 692 | 34.5 | |
| Conservative | Jonathan Hollins | 561 | 28.0 | |
| Newport Ind. | Michael Cox | 526 | 26.2 | |
| Newport Ind. | Rachel Reaney | 482 | 24.0 | |
| Liberal Democrats | Sarah Lockyer | 147 | 7.3 | |
| Liberal Democrats | Kobir Ahmed | 87 | 4.3 | |
| Turnout | | | | |
| Labour hold | | | | |
| Labour hold | | | | |
| Labour hold | | | | |

=== Pillgwenlly ===
Pillgwenlly
| Party | Candidate | Votes | % | ±% |
|---|---|---|---|---|
| Labour | Saeed Adan | 840 | 55.4 | |
| Labour | Debbie Jenkins | 759 | 50.1 | |
| Newport Ind. | Marc Ravenscroft | 347 | 22.9 | |
| Newport Ind. | Wan Taylor | 298 | 19.7 | |
| Liberal Democrats | Shamimul Islam | 270 | 17.8 | |
| Plaid Cymru | Khalilur Rahman | 151 | 10.0 | |
| Conservative | Brinley Cox | 133 | 8.8 | |
| Conservative | Judith Davies | 129 | 8.5 | |
| Liberal Democrats | Mihai Munteanu | 103 | 6.8 | |
| Turnout | | | | |
| Labour hold | | | | |
| Labour hold | | | | |

=== Ringland ===
Ringland
| Party | Candidate | Votes | % | ±% |
|---|---|---|---|---|
| Labour | Emma Corten | 901 | 69.7 | |
| Labour | Laura Lacey * | 884 | 68.4 | |
| Labour | Malcolm Linton * | 809 | 62.6 | |
| Conservative | Tina Evans | 374 | 28.9 | |
| Conservative | Nicola Hobbs | 348 | 26.9 | |
| Conservative | Georgina Webb | 319 | 24.7 | |
| Independent | Raymond Lord | 243 | 18.8 | |
| Turnout | | | 24.6 | |
| Labour hold | | | | |
| Labour hold | | | | |
| Labour hold | | | | |

=== Rogerstone East ===
Rogerstone East
| Party | Candidate | Votes | % |
|---|---|---|---|
| Labour | Bev Davies | 503 | 62.6 |
| Conservative | Toby Jones | 243 | 30.3 |
| Liberal Democrats | Shopon Chowdhury | 57 | 7.1 |
| Majority | | | |
| Turnout | | | 33.6 |
| Labour win (new seat) | | | |

=== Rogerstone North ===
Rogerstone North
| Party | Candidate | Votes | % |
|---|---|---|---|
| Conservative | Chris Reeks | 667 | 54.9 |
| Labour | Jonathan Gibbons | 548 | 45.1 |
| Majority | | | |
| Turnout | | | 51.2 |
| Conservative win (new seat) | | | |

=== Rogerstone West ===
Rogerstone West
| Party | Candidate | Votes | % |
|---|---|---|---|
| Labour | Yvonne Forsey | 1,133 | 68.3 |
| Labour | John Reynolds | 916 | 55.2 |
| Conservative | Andrew Hill | 532 | 32.0 |
| Conservative | Graham Berry | 530 | 31.9 |
| Liberal Democrats | Liz Newton | 209 | 12.6 |
| Turnout | | | 31.5 |
| Labour win (new seat) | | | |
| Labour win (new seat) | | | |

Forsey had been one of the sitting councillors in the former Rogerstone ward.

=== Shaftesbury ===
Shaftesbury (2 seats)
| Party | Candidate | Votes | % | ±% |
|---|---|---|---|---|
| Labour | Paul Cockeram * | 503 | 44.3 | |
| Green | Lauren James | 475 | 41.9 | |
| Labour | Nicky Vignoli | 401 | 35.3 | |
| Green | Tanya Sinnett | 358 | 31.5 | |
| Conservative | Judy Gilligan | 205 | 18.1 | |
| Conservative | Khushbir Bhullar | 167 | 14.7 | |
| Newport Ind. | Rhys Richards | 161 | 14.2 | |
| Turnout | | | 31.9 | |
| Labour hold | | | | |
| Green gain from Labour | | | | |

James became Newport's first ever Green Party councillor.

=== St Julian's ===
St Julian's
| Party | Candidate | Votes | % | ±% |
|---|---|---|---|---|
| Labour | Paul Bright | 1,004 | 48.8 | |
| Labour | Phil Hourahine * | 963 | 46.8 | |
| Liberal Democrats | Carmel Townsend * | 898 | 43.7 | |
| Labour | Asum Mahmood | 844 | 41.0 | |
| Liberal Democrats | Mike Hamilton | 726 | 35.3 | |
| Liberal Democrats | Oliver Townsend | 718 | 34.9 | |
| Conservative | Michael Enea | 418 | 20.3 | |
| Conservative | Marie Jermyn | 338 | 16.4 | |
| Conservative | Muhammad Tariq | 262 | 12.7 | |
| Turnout | | | 34.5 | |
| Labour gain from Liberal Democrats | | | | |
| Labour hold | | | | |
| Liberal Democrats hold | | | | |

=== Stow Hill ===
Stow Hill
| Party | Candidate | Votes | % | ±% |
|---|---|---|---|---|
| Labour | Kate Thomas * | 879 | 67.9 | |
| Labour | Miqdad Al-Nuaimi * | 804 | 62.1 | |
| Conservative | Saleh Baqi | 366 | 28.3 | |
| Newport Ind. | Nick Baneswell | 305 | 23.6 | |
| Conservative | Ben Jones | 234 | 18.1 | |
| Turnout | | | 31.2 | |
| Labour hold | | | | |
| Labour hold | | | | |

=== Tredegar Park and Marshfield ===
Tredegar Park and Marshfield
| Party | Candidate | Votes | % |
|---|---|---|---|
| Labour | Rhian Howells | 1,148 | 54.4 |
| Labour | Allan Screen | 993 | 47.1 |
| Labour | Trevor Watkins | 917 | 43.5 |
| Conservative | Sarah Nurse | 855 | 40.5 |
| Conservative | Wayne Cresswell | 846 | 40.1 |
| Conservative | Brian Miles | 846 | 40.1 |
| Green | Catherine Linstrum | 440 | 20.9 |
| Propel | Celia Jones | 156 | 7.4 |
| Propel | Shane Williams | 125 | 5.9 |
| Turnout | | | 28.5 |
| Labour win (new seat) | | | |
| Labour win (new seat) | | | |
| Labour win (new seat) | | | |

Watkins had been the sitting councillor for the former Tredegar Park ward.

=== Victoria ===
Victoria
| Party | Candidate | Votes | % | ±% |
|---|---|---|---|---|
| Labour | Gavin Horton * | 982 | 54.4 | |
| Labour | Farzina Hussain * | 933 | 51.7 | |
| Conservative | Bilal Meah | 449 | 24.9 | |
| Conservative | Faisal Rahman | 426 | 23.6 | |
| Liberal Democrats | John Miller | 350 | 19.4 | |
| Liberal Democrats | Nurul Islam | 293 | 16.2 | |
| Newport Ind. | Annette Farmer | 179 | 9.9 | |
| Turnout | | | 34.3 | |
| Labour hold | | | | |
| Labour hold | | | | |

Horton and Hussain had won seats in this ward at two separate by-elections in 2021.

== By-elections ==
=== Rogerstone North (2026) ===
The by-election took place following the resignation of Conservative councillor, Chris Reeks, citing personal reasons. The winning candidate, Nicholas Portman known locally as Nick Baneswell, was a local pub landlord.

Rogerstone North by-election: 7 May 2026
| Party | Candidate | Votes | % | ±% |
|---|---|---|---|---|
| Conservative | Nick Baneswell | 597 | 36.1 | −18.8 |
| Reform | Kevin Russell Preston | 402 | 24.3 | +24.3 |
| Plaid Cymru | Iestyn Davies | 287 | 17.3 | +17.3 |
| Labour | Jonathan Thomas Gibbons | 204 | 12.3 | −32.8 |
| Green | Stuart John Jones | 108 | 12.2 | +12.2 |
| Turnout | | 1,598 | 69.7 | +18.5 |
| Conservative hold | | Swing | | |
