= Pye Corner =

Pye Corner may refer to:

- Pye Corner, an area of the village of Nash, Newport, Wales
- Pye Corner, an area of the High Cross, Newport, Wales
  - Pye Corner railway station, Newport, Wales
- Golden Boy of Pye Corner, a statue in London, England
- Pye Corner Audio, a British electronic music project by Martin Jenkins
