= Coldra =

Coordinates: 51.598192°N 2.935738°W

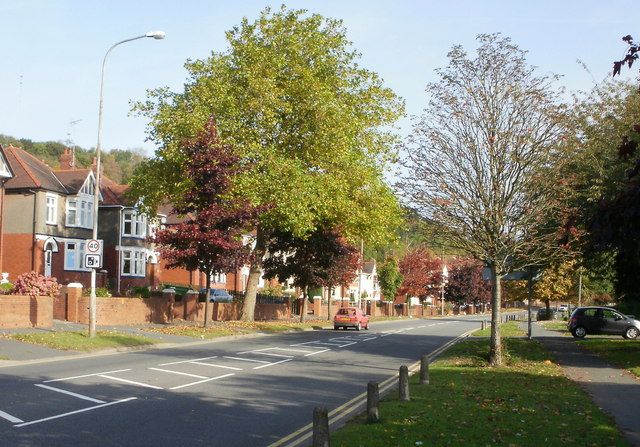

- Location within Newport
- Population: 134
- OS grid reference: ST334870
- Community: Ringland
- Principal area: Newport
- Country: Wales
- Sovereign state: United Kingdom
- Post town: NEWPORT
- Postcode district: NP18
- Dialling code: 01633
- Police: Gwent
- Fire: South Wales
- Ambulance: Welsh
- UK Parliament: Newport East

Coldra is an area within the electoral ward of Ringland, Newport, Wales. It lies between The Coldra Roundabout and Ringland, Newport.
