= Victoria, Newport =

Victoria
- Location within Newport
- Population: 7,464 (2011 census)
- OS grid reference: ST325885
- Principal area: Newport
- Country: Wales
- Sovereign state: United Kingdom
- Post town: NEWPORT
- Postcode district: NP19 0,8
- Dialling code: 01633; Savoy exchange
- Police: Gwent
- Fire: South Wales
- Ambulance: Welsh
- UK Parliament: Newport East
- Senedd Cymru – Welsh Parliament: Newport East
- List of places UK Wales Newport 51.59129°N 2.97577°W Map of the community

Victoria is both a community (civil parish) and an electoral ward (division) of the city of Newport.

The ward is bounded by the River Usk to the west and south, Newport Bridge, Clarence Place, Church Road and Christchurch Road to the north, Victoria Avenue, Wharf Road (as far as the railway bridge), a section of the Great Western Main Line as far as (but not including) Soho Street, Telford Street and Lilleshall Street to the east. The area is governed by the Newport City Council.

The ward includes the district of Maindee, as well as the home of Newport Rugby Club.

The district as a whole, and Maindee in particular, is home to a large Asian population. Many people are of Pakistani and Bangladeshi origin and there are now a slowly increasing number of Kurdish refugees.

== Governance ==
Victoria ward elects two councillors to Newport City Council.

Two by-elections took place within six months in 2021, after Christine Jenkins resigned on health grounds and, in October 2021, long-serving Abdul-Majid Rahman resigned for personal reasons. Rahman was later jailed, in May 2022, having been found in possession of indecent images of children.

Labour's Gavin Horton and Farzina Hussain, who had each won a 2021 by-election, were re-elected at the May 2022 elections.
