= Llanwern (electoral ward) =

Electoral division in Newport, Wales

Coordinates: 51.558°N 2.907°W

Llanwern is an electoral ward for Newport City Council in south Wales. It covers several rural communities to the east of the city. It is represented by one city councillor.

== Description ==
The Llanwern ward covers the communities (civil parishes) of Llanwern, Nash, Goldcliff and Redwick. It has an electorate of 1,861.

Prior to the 2022 local elections (prior to an electoral boundary review by the Local Government Boundary Commission for Wales) Llanwern also included the community of Bishton, though Nash was part of the neighbouring Lliswerry ward. The review was designed to improve electoral parity, towards an average electorate per councillor of 2,146.

The population of the Llanwern ward at the 2011 census was 2,961.

== Representation ==
Since 1995 Llanwern has been represented by one councillor on Newport County Borough Council and (from 2002) Newport City Council. It was represented by the Labour Party until 2004, when it elected an independent councillor, Carole Attwell. In December 2007 Attwell joined the Conservative Party.

Since 2008 Llanwern has been represented by Conservative councillor, Martyn Kellaway. Kellaway was brought up in Barry, Vale of Glamorgan and later became a chef for British Steel. In 2022 he was put forward as the new mayor of Newport, to take office after the May 2022 council election.
