= St Julians, Newport =

St Julians
- Location within Newport
- Population: 8,675 (2011 census)
- OS grid reference: ST322894
- Principal area: Newport
- Country: Wales
- Sovereign state: United Kingdom
- Post town: NEWPORT
- Postcode district: NP19 7
- Dialling code: 01633
- Police: Gwent
- Fire: South Wales
- Ambulance: Welsh
- UK Parliament: Newport East
- Senedd Cymru – Welsh Parliament: Newport East
- List of places UK Wales Newport 51.59934°N 2.98027°W Map of the community

St Julians (Welsh: Sain Silian) is a community and coterminous electoral district (ward) of the City of Newport, South Wales.

The community is bounded by the River Usk to the west and north, The Moorings, Badminton Road, Reynolds Close, Rembrandt Way, Constable Drive, Heather Road, Kelly Road, Merlin Crescent, Avalon Drive, across St Julian's Road and Norfolk Road to the east, Christchurch Road, Church Road, Clarence Place and Newport Bridge to the south. The ward includes the districts of Barnardtown, Riverside, and most of St. Julians (the rest being in Beechwood ward).

== History ==
The Anglican parish church for St Julians is dedicated to the martyred Saints of Julius and Aaron and sits mid-way along Heather Road, while the Roman Catholic church, dedicated to St Julius, is on Beaufort Road. St Julian's Methodist Church is situated at the junction of Caerleon Road with St Julian's Avenue; St Julian's Baptist Church is in Beaufort Road. The roads in the post-war St Julian's estate are named after famous painters, whereas the older inter-war estate streets are named after the members of the Firbank family who owned the land from 1869 to 1926. St Julians itself is named after Saint Julius of Caerleon, the Roman martyr.

== Education ==
St Julians has two primary schools, namely Glan Usk Primary School (formerly Durham Road Infant School and Durham Road Junior School) and St Julian's Primary School.

St Julian's School opened in 1953.

Glan Usk Primary School opened in January 2010, after receiving £9.7m in funding from the Welsh Government. The development is however controversial as it is situated on a former toxic waste landfill site at the Glebelands in the western part of St Julians. The new school also provides nursery school places, following the closure of Rockfield Nursery.

== Governance ==
St Julians is also the name of the coterminous electoral ward to Newport City Council. It has been represented by three councillors on Newport Council since 1995. The ward elected three Labour Party councillors in 1995 and 1999, then three Liberal Democrat councillors in 2004 and 2008. Since 2012 the ward has elected a mixture of Labour and Lib Dem councillors.

In 2016 long-serving Lib Dem councillor Ed Townsend died and his seat was won at a by-election by his widow, Carmel Townsend. Carmel Townsend had previously won a seat at the 2008 election.

== St. Julian's House ==
Built in 1480 on the site of a chapel that housed the mortal remains of Saint Julius, the house and estate was established by Sir George Herbert (c. 1462-1504). It was owned and lived in by the Herbert family until about 1720 when the Tudor mansion was downsized to a farmhouse and parts of the estate became derelict. St. Julian's was then passed on to the Duke of Beaufort, who leased the farmhouse out in the early 19th century. In 1869, the estate was purchased at a Newport auction by Joseph Firbank (1819-1886), a railway contractor from Durham, for £38,000. In 1880 he rebuilt St. Julian's as a Victorian farmhouse, retaining the Tudor porch and the cruciform layout. He also built a grander and more modern mansion south of Caerleon Road adjacent to Llanllecha Farm, called (Upper) St. Julian's, while the original house became Lower or Old St. Julian's. This was then leased out again to farm tenants from 1892. In 1933, Upper St. Julian's was demolished and replaced by a new housing development on Heather Road, and following the Second World War the older house was converted into a motor garage. The land surrounding the house had by this point been sold off and built on, leaving St. Julian's to become completely derelict by the 1970s. It was eventually demolished in 1980 and Marina Court is now situated on the site.
