= Christchurch, Newport =

Village in Gwent, Wales

Coordinates: 51.599°N 2.945°W

Christchurch: Welsh: Eglwys y Drindod
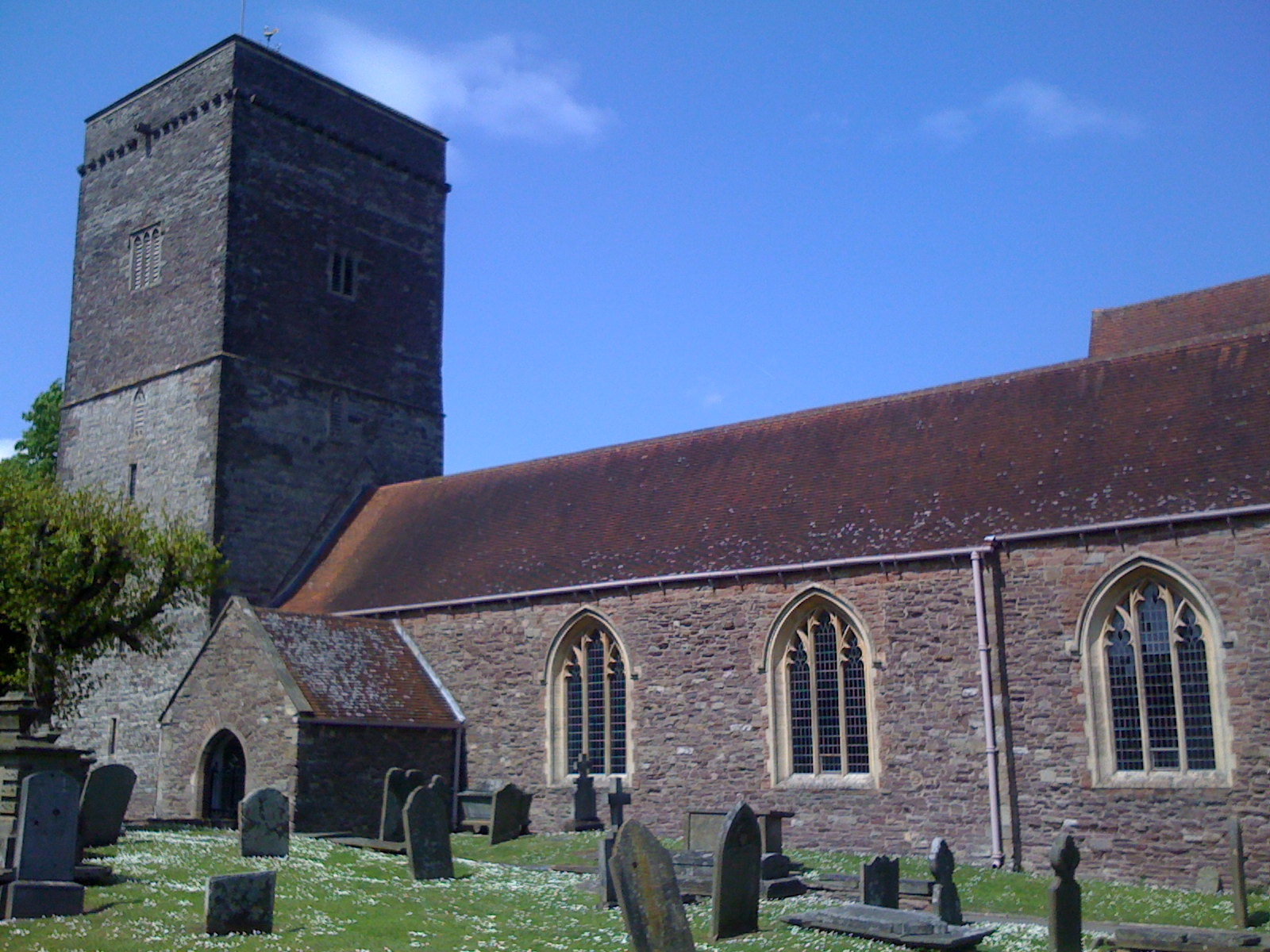
- Holy Trinity Church, Christchurch

- Location within Newport
- Population: 233
- Principal area: Newport
- Preserved county: Gwent
- Country: Wales
- Sovereign state: United Kingdom
- Post town: NEWPORT
- Postcode district: NP18
- Dialling code: 01633; Maindee exchange
- Police: Gwent
- Fire: South Wales
- Ambulance: Welsh
- UK Parliament: Newport East

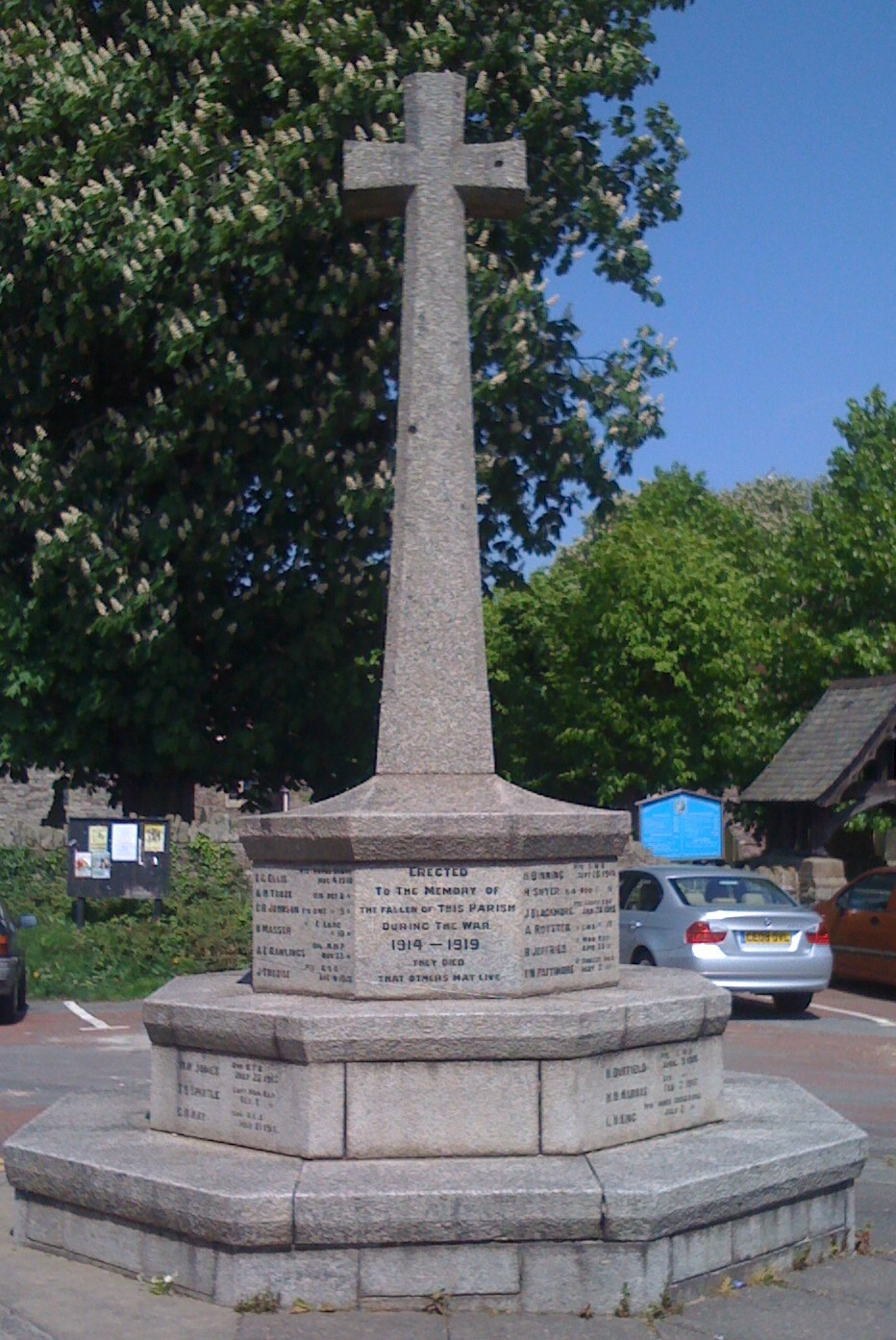
War Memorial, Christchurch, Newport

Christchurch (Welsh: Eglwys y Drindod) is a village located at the top of Christchurch Hill in the Caerleon ward and community of the city of Newport, South Wales. The top of the hill affords panoramic views both towards the Bristol Channel in the south and through the Vale of Usk and into the Monmouthshire countryside to the north. The road, which runs along the crest of the hill, runs westwards to Newport and eastwards towards Caerleon and Catsash.

The parish church is Holy Trinity. Christchurch has a modern purpose-built village hall and the Christchurch Music Society is a vibrant amateur musical theatre group. Due to its elevated position, the hill is home to the Christchurch transmitter, located near the Celtic Manor Resort.

The church has a Norman doorway with columns five feet high. The axis of the chancel is set in a more southerly direction to that of the nave. In the churchyard is the grave of Captain William Howe, skipper of the packet "Welsh Prince", which is portrayed in a carving at the head of his tombstone.

== History ==
In 1648, during the English Civil War, Oliver Cromwell's troops camped overnight on Christchurch Hill overlooking Newport before their attack on Newport Castle the next day. A cannonball dug up from a garden in nearby Summerhill Avenue, dating from this time, is exhibited in Newport Museum. The soldiers destroyed almost all of the stained glass in the church, except for one fragment which remains in the east window.

A tombstone in the north aisle bears a carving of a woman's head, dated 1712 and known as "The Beauty of Christchurch". Traditionally, on the eve of the Feast of Corpus Christi, parishioners would bring their sick children to the "Healing Stone of Christchurch", a medieval grave-stone in the chancel, in the hope of a cure. The custom became subject to abuse and bribery, until it was ended by the Squire Van of Llanwern, in about 1810.

On 6 November 1949 the church was almost destroyed by fire. Although the church records and the ancient chalice were saved, almost the entire building, apart from the walls and tower, burnt down. A week later St John's Church in Maindee suffered a similar fate. The fire, among the worst Newport's had experienced, caused damage valued at £30,000 (equivalent to £1,340,000 in 2023), The roof had recently been repaired. "The Beauty of Christchurch" survived the fire but was accidentally destroyed during the reconstruction of the church.

Christchurch is the location of one of Newport's large municipal cemeteries, north of Christchurch Road overlooking Caerleon. Nearby once stood Christchurch Junior School.

Christchurch has a War Memorial, to combatants of World War I and World War II, directly in front of the church, and a public house, The Greyhound Inn, opposite.
