= Shaftesbury, Newport =

Shaftesbury
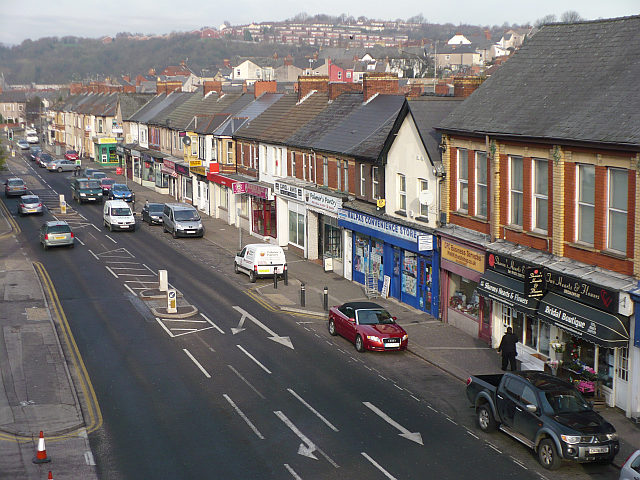

- Location within Newport
- Population: 5,135 (2011 census)
- OS grid reference: ST309896
- Principal area: Newport
- Country: Wales
- Sovereign state: United Kingdom
- Post town: NEWPORT
- Postcode district: NP20 5
- Dialling code: 01633; Chartist exchange
- Police: Gwent
- Fire: South Wales
- Ambulance: Welsh
- UK Parliament: Newport East
- List of places UK Wales Newport 51.60098°N 2.99908°W Map of the community

Shaftesbury is a community (civil parish) and coterminous electoral district (ward) of the city of Newport, South Wales.

The community is bounded by the River Usk to the east and southeast, the Great Western Main Line to the south, the A4042 road to the southwest as far as the Harlequin intersection, at which point the border diverts up Barrack Hill behind Harlequin Drive, Power Street and Lambert Close to meet the Monmouthshire Canal which then forms the western boundary as far as Bettws Lane Bridge. The northern boundary is formed by the western and northern edges of Graig Wood, Yewberry Lane and south of Grove Park Drive.

== Governance ==
The Shaftesbury ward elects two city councillors to Newport City Council.

At the May 2022 election the seats were won by Paul Cockeram for Labour and Lauren James, the city's first Green Party councillor.
