= Graig, Newport =

Graig
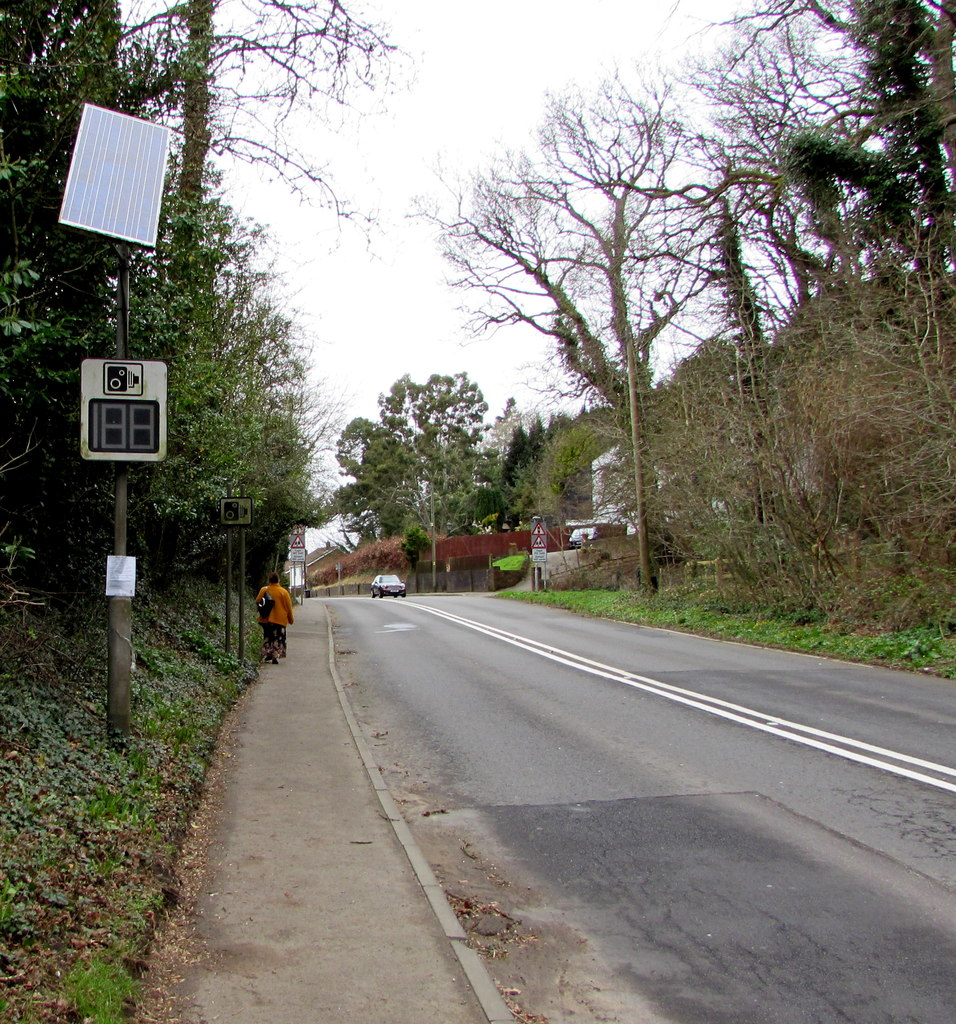
- Caerphilly Road

- Location within Newport
- Population: 6,159 (2011 census)
- OS grid reference: ST264870
- Principal area: Newport
- Country: Wales
- Sovereign state: United Kingdom
- Post town: NEWPORT
- Postcode district: NP10 8
- Dialling code: 01633; Rhiwderin exchange
- Police: Gwent
- Fire: South Wales
- Ambulance: Welsh
- UK Parliament: Newport West and Islwyn
- Senedd Cymru – Welsh Parliament: Newport West
- List of places UK Wales Newport 51.57704°N 3.06349°W Map of the community

Graig is an electoral ward and coterminous community (parish) of the city of Newport, South Wales.

The ward is bounded by the Ebbw River and M4 motorway to the east, and the city boundary to the north and west. The southern boundary is formed by a line from the M4/A467 intersection in a roughly westerly direction as far as the city boundary. The area is governed by the Newport City Council.

The ward contains Bassaleg, Pentre-poeth (or Pentrepoeth), Rhiwderin and the hamlet of Lower Machen.

The site of a large Roman fort and its earthworks can be seen from the motorway.
