= Bishpool =

Coordinates: 51.593851°N 2.943428°W

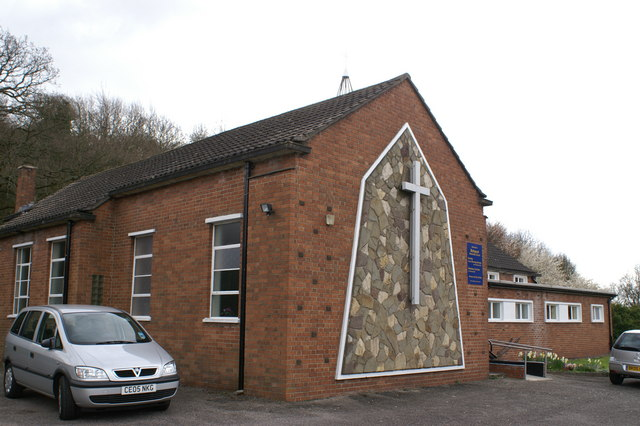

- Location within Newport
- Population: 400
- OS grid reference: ST334870
- Principal area: Newport
- Country: Wales
- Sovereign state: United Kingdom
- Post town: NEWPORT
- Postcode district: NP19 9
- Dialling code: 01633; Maindee exchange
- Police: Gwent
- Fire: South Wales
- Ambulance: Welsh
- UK Parliament: Newport East

Bishpool is a suburb within the electoral ward of Ringland, Newport. It lies to the western side of Ringland. Its facilities include Bishpool Methodist Church, Bishpool Dairy, and The Man of Gwent. With modern housing, it has a population of 400.
