= Michaelston-y-Fedw =

Village and community in Newport, Wales

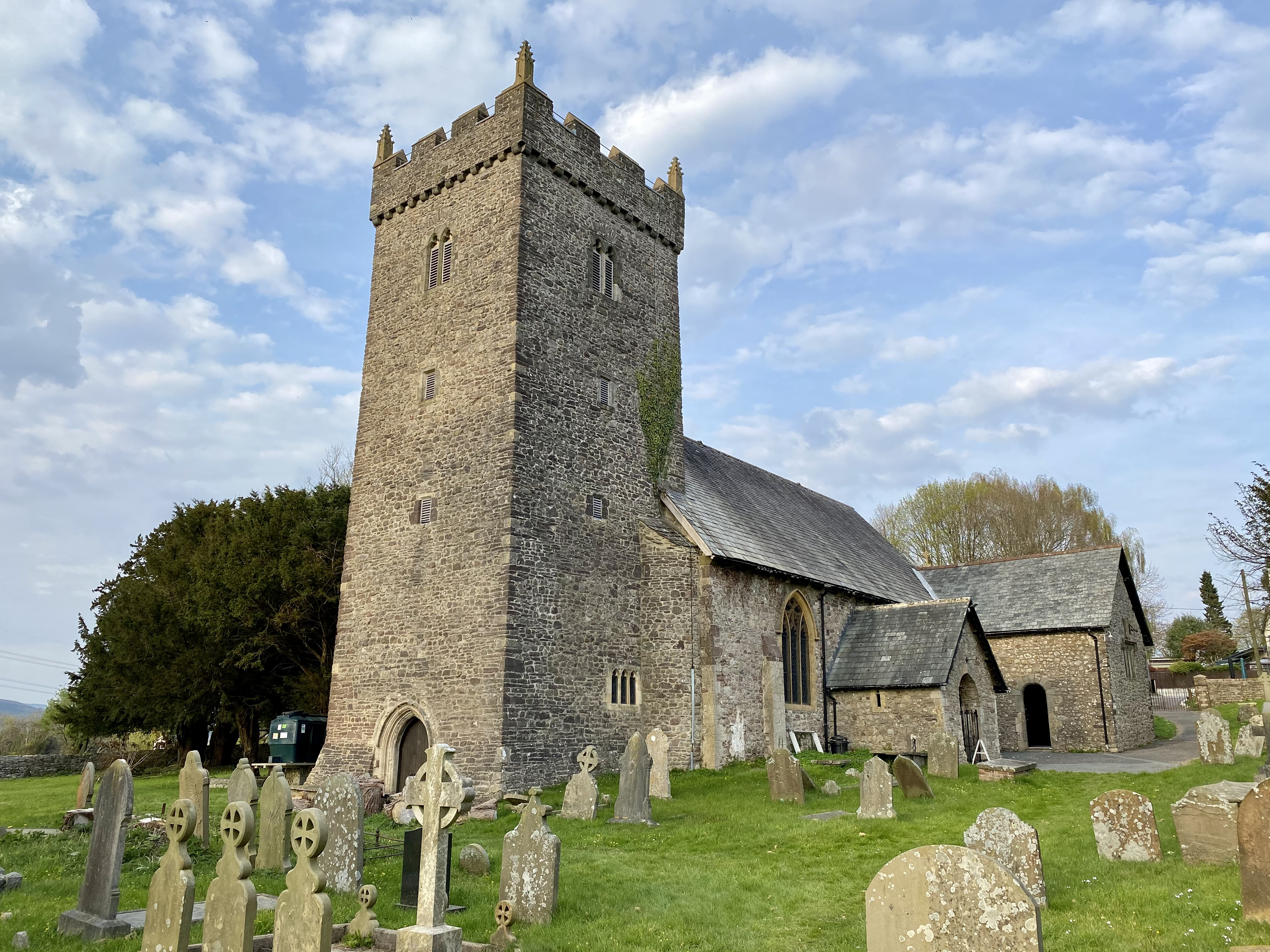
- St Michael's Church

- Location within Newport
- Population: 365 (2001 census)
- OS grid reference: ST241845
- Principal area: Newport
- Country: Wales
- Sovereign state: United Kingdom
- Post town: NEWPORT
- Postcode district: NP10 8
- Post town: CARDIFF
- Postcode district: CF3 6
- Dialling code: 01633; Castleton exchange
- Police: Gwent
- Fire: South Wales
- Ambulance: Welsh
- UK Parliament: Newport West
- List of places UK Wales Newport 51.55426°N 3.09614°W Map of the community

Michaelston-y-Fedw (Welsh: Llanfihangel-y-fedw) is a small rural village and community to the west of the city of Newport, Wales, on the borders of Cardiff city and Caerphilly county boroughs. The population in 2011 was 296.

== History and description ==
Michaelston-y-Fedw is a partial Anglicization of the Welsh Llanfihangel-y-fedw – meaning "church enclosure (of) Michael (in) the birches" – may also be seen spelt "Michaelstone-y-Fedw", "Michaelston-y-Vedw" and "Michaelstone-y-Vedw", the parish church being dedicated to Saint Michael. The community is bounded by the Rhymney River to the west, the A48(M) motorway to the south, and the Pound Hill road to the north and east. It contains Michaelston itself as well as a small cluster of houses known as Michaelstone Bridge or Lower Michaelstone about a mile to the north.

=== Church of St Michael ===
The Church of St Michael is a Grade II* listed building. The Old Rectory, opposite the Cefn Mably Arms public house and the church, has its own Grade II listing. The pub opened in 1824 and, since 2017, an annual ceremony sees the vicar bless the beer, the public house and the village.

=== Community interest fibre network ===
On 25 June 2018 the village became the first community in Wales to create its own fibre network, connecting homes and businesses to the Internet with fibre to the premises, giving each a connection speed of 1 Gbit/s, and became known as ‘The Fastest Village in Wales’. The network was designed and installed by volunteers from the community. On 19 November 2018 Michaelston-y-Fedw Internet CIC (MyFi, the community interest company set up to run the fibre broadband project in the village) was awarded the European Broadband Award for Innovative Models of Financing, Business and Investment.

== Government ==
The area is administered by Newport City Council.
