= Stow Hill =

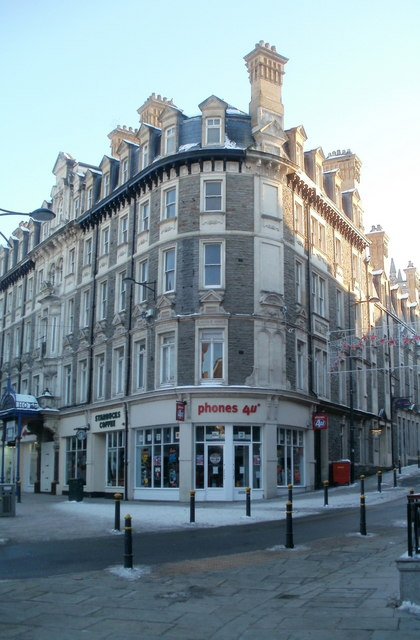
- Former Westgate Hotel

- Location within Newport
- Population: 4,773 (2011 census)
- OS grid reference: ST307879
- Community: Stow Hill
- Principal area: Newport
- Country: Wales
- Sovereign state: United Kingdom
- Post town: NEWPORT
- Postcode district: NP20 1,4
- Dialling code: 01633; Savoy exchange
- Police: Gwent
- Fire: South Wales
- Ambulance: Welsh
- UK Parliament: Newport East
- Senedd Cymru – Welsh Parliament: Newport West
- List of places UK Wales Newport 51.58568°N 3.00163°W Map of the community

Stow Hill is a community civil parish and coterminous electoral district (ward) of the City of Newport, South Wales.

It is bounded by the River Usk to the east, George Street and Cardiff Road to the south, the Great Western Main Line to the southwest, Caerau Crescent, Caerau Road, Godfrey Road, Devon Place and Mill Street to the north. The ward contains the districts of St. Woolos and Baneswell.

== City centre ==
The community covers most of the city centre including most of the city's major retailers as well as the centre for nightlife in the city, being home to many of Newport's well-known nightclubs and bars.

The community also contains Newport Castle on the banks of the River Usk and St. Woolos Cathedral atop Stow Hill itself. It is also the location of Havelock Street Presbyterian Church where, in 1887, the Boys' Brigade movement in Wales was founded by George Philip Reynolds. Stow Hill's earliest inhabitant was, according to legend, Saint Gwynllyw.

Apart from the Central Business District of Newport, there is also a significant resident population here in a relatively small area. Much of the housing is made up of rows of densely packed Victorian terraced houses.

== Electoral ward ==
Stow Hill is an electoral ward coterminous with the community. The ward elects two city councillors to Newport City Council. The ward has generally been represented by the Labour Party since 1995, but also elected Conservative councillors between 2004 and 2012.

Following a boundary review to improve electoral parity, the Mon Bank development would be transferred from the neighbouring Pillgwenlly ward, effective from the 2022 local elections.
