= Brynglas =

Coordinates: 51.6047°N 2.9983°W

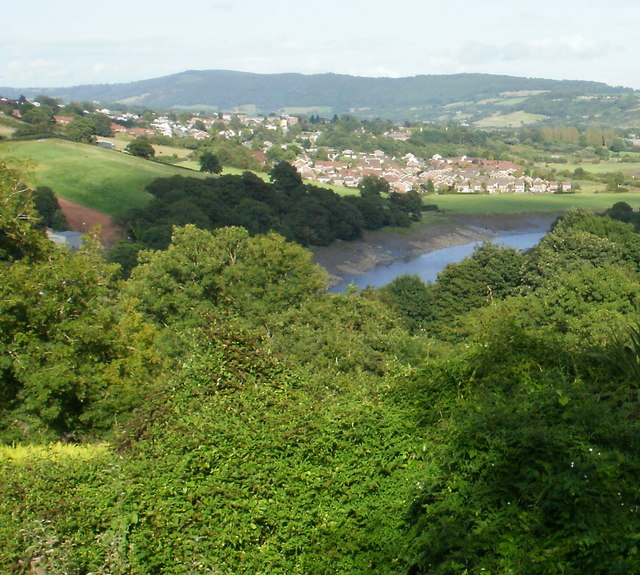
- View from the top of Brynglas

- Location within Newport
- Population: 300
- OS grid reference: ST309900
- Principal area: Newport
- Country: Wales
- Sovereign state: United Kingdom
- Post town: NEWPORT
- Postcode district: NP20 5
- Dialling code: 01633
- Police: Gwent
- Fire: South Wales
- Ambulance: Welsh
- UK Parliament: Newport West
- Senedd Cymru – Welsh Parliament: Newport West

Brynglas is an area of the city of Newport, South Wales, United Kingdom.

== Location ==
View over Newport from Brynglas Drive

Brynglas is situated above the M4 motorway, which passes through the Brynglas Tunnels, and overlooking the city of Newport. It has a population of about 300 inhabitants and contains a primary school and Brynglas House.

The area contains the streets of Brynglas Avenue, Brynglas Drive, Brynglas Road, Brynglas Close, Brynglas Court, Brynglas Crescent and the relatively modern Bryn-Bevan estate.

Brynglas Road was the first road to be built in the Brynglas area. The houses were privately owned. The road originally led solely to Brynglas House on top of the hill. A council estate, Brynglas Drive, was later added. It consists mostly of post-war concrete-structured housing originally built and owned by Newport Corporation. Most of the housing is now privately owned but Newport City Council still owns some.

Brynglas Court and Brynglas Close consist of council-style flats.

== Etymology ==
The name comes from the Welsh language for "Blue Hill". Locals speculate that the reasoning for this name is due to the thousands of common bluebells that appear each spring in the Brynglas bluebell woods. Prior to development the south-facing hill would have appeared blue during the spring around April and May and therefore was called "Brynglas".

== Local landmarks ==
- Brynglas House
- Crindau House (oldest house in Newport)
- Brynglas Primary School
- Brynglas Tunnels

== Brynglas Tunnels ==
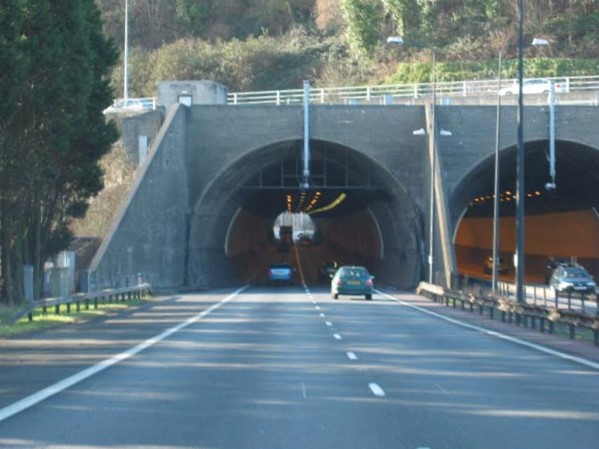
The eastern portal.

The Brynglas Tunnels carry the M4 motorway under Brynglas Hill. The 1,200 ft-long twin-bored tunnels were the first tunnels in the British motorway network and are still the only bored tunnels using tunnel boring machines.

The tunnels and adjacent Usk bridge were originally planned by Newport Corporation in August 1959 in a plan submitted to the Ministry of Transport. Work started on 10 September 1962 and both structures were complete and open to traffic by 1967.

Almost as soon as the M4 Newport bypass (junctions 24-28) had opened, the traffic levels had grown to such a degree that the road had to be widened to three lanes in each direction. This was finished in 1982 but with the exception of the tunnels and Usk bridge which remained as dual two-lane sections. During the original construction several houses on Brynglas Road above the tunnels had to be demolished due to structural weaknesses caused by the tunnelling. Therefore, the technical challenges and risk associated with widening the existing tunnels in a highly built-up area were found to be too great. The tunnels remain a bottleneck on the motorway and as of 2011 a new bypass south of the city has been proposed, the M4 relief road.

== Brynglas House ==
Owned by Newport City Council, it is currently the training department for Newport Social Services. However, it has had many uses in the past such as being used as a hospital during World War II, a secondary school through the 1960s and early 1970s, and an Adult Education Centre until 2014. The gardens and pleasure grounds surrounding the house are listed on the Cadw/ICOMOS Register of Parks and Gardens of Special Historic Interest in Wales.
