= Level of Mendalgief =

Coordinates: 51.573°N 3.001°W

Mendalgief: Welsh: Mendelgyf
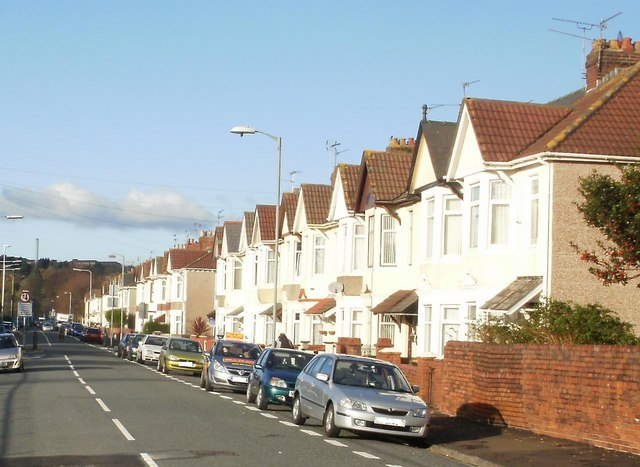
- Mendalgief Road, Newport

- Location within Newport
- Population: 389
- OS grid reference: ST306864
- Principal area: Newport
- Country: Wales
- Sovereign state: United Kingdom
- Post town: NEWPORT
- Dialling code: 01633; Savoy exchange
- Police: Gwent
- Fire: South Wales
- Ambulance: Welsh
- UK Parliament: Newport West

The Level of Mendalgief (Welsh: Mendelgyf) is a small area to the south west of the city centre of the city of Newport in the Pill ward. The level is bounded by Cardiff Road to the north, Mendalgief Road to the east, Docks Way to the south and the Great Western Main Line to the west. The area formerly contained the Monmouthshire Bank sidings, but has been regenerated into a new residential area.

The etymology of the name Mendalgief is unknown.
