= Alway =

- Location within Newport
- Population: 8,573 (2019 census)
- OS grid reference: ST339881
- Principal area: Newport
- Country: Wales
- Sovereign state: United Kingdom
- Post town: NEWPORT
- Postcode district: NP19 8,9
- Dialling code: 01633; Maindee exchange
- Police: Gwent
- Fire: South Wales
- Ambulance: Welsh
- UK Parliament: Newport East
- Senedd Cymru – Welsh Parliament: Newport East
- List of places UK Wales Newport 51.58786°N 2.95549°W Map of the community

Alway is an electoral district (ward) and coterminous community (formerly civil parish) of the city of Newport.

The ward is bounded by the Great Western Main Line to the south, Windsor Road, Chepstow Road and Beechwood Road to the west, the M4 motorway to the north, and a line running between Glanwern Grove, Ringwood Hill, Ringland Circle, Aberthaw Road, and Balfe Road to the east. The area is governed by Newport City Council.

The ward contains the Alway Estate itself plus Somerton and the eastern fringes of Beechwood around Beechwood Park. It is also home to Ladyhill Reservoir, a 22.5 ML treated water storage facility that serves the east of the city.

== See also ==
- Somerton TARDIS
