= Cat's Ash =

Hamlet in Newport, Wales

Coordinates: 51.6123°N 2.9092°W

Cat's Ash (Welsh: Cathonnen) is a small hamlet to the east of the city centre of the city of Newport, South East Wales.

The placename in both English and Welsh refers to ash trees.

The Usk Valley Walk passes close by.
