= Maindee =

Coordinates: 51°35′24″N 2°58′34″W

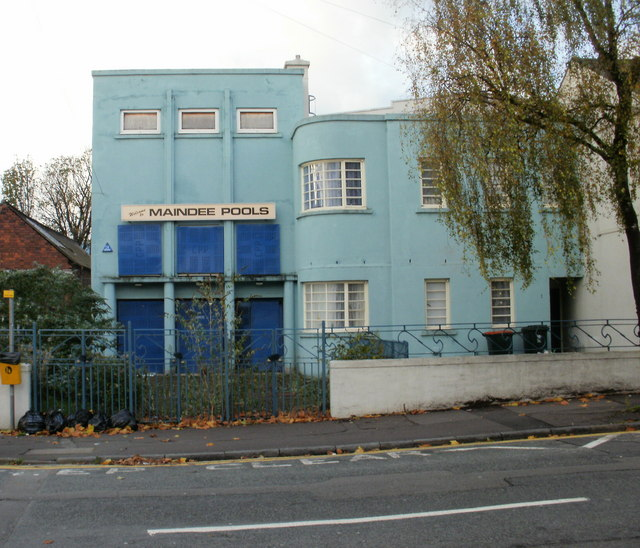
- Former Maindee Swimming Baths
- Population: 6,700 (2011 census)
- OS grid reference: ST331885
- Principal area: Newport
- Country: Wales
- Sovereign state: United Kingdom
- Post town: NEWPORT
- Postcode district: NP19
- Dialling code: 01633; Savoy exchange
- Police: Gwent
- Fire: South Wales
- Ambulance: Welsh
- UK Parliament: Newport East

Maindee (Welsh: Maendy) is a large inner-city commercial and residential area in the city of Newport, South Wales.

It lies on the eastern side of the River Usk, mostly within the electoral district (ward) of Victoria, although some areas traditionally associated with Maindee are in the Beechwood ward.

The name 'Maindee' is an anglicised version of Maendy meaning 'stone house'.

Maindee is home to a sizeable Asian-Muslim population growing steadily since 1980, with three mosques located in the area.

A large selection of shops are located on Chepstow Road, Corporation Road and Church Road. A station of Gwent Police and a public library are located on Chepstow Road. A station of South Wales Fire and Rescue Service is also located in Maindee.

The annual Maindee Festival and Parade, held each Summer since 1996, is a popular community arts event for all residents in Newport.

The area is home to the former Maindee Pools. The art deco building opened on Victoria Avenue in 1938, and closed in 2005. The pool and its forecourt are registered as a Grade II listed building. The BBC TV series Being Human used the empty swimming pool for location shots.

Maindee Unlimited, a community-led regeneration charity for the Maindee area, was formed in 2014. It re-opened Llyfrgell Maindee Library for community use in October 2015. It re-opened the public toilets on Chepstow Road as "Maindee Triangle" in 2023. As "Greening Maindee", the charity also runs a range of environmental and public gardening projects.
