= Bulmore =

Hamlet in Newport, Wales

Coordinates: 51°36′20.11″N 2°56′48.56″W

Bulmore or Bullmoor (Welsh: Y Pwll Mawr) is a hamlet in the south-east of the Caerleon ward of the city of Newport, South Wales. The name is derived from the Welsh Y Pwll Mawr meaning The Large Pool. It was first settled by the Romans.

In 1934 an area of land forming part of Bulmore Farm was purchased and an open-air swimming pool known as Bulmore Lido which was built and opened in July of that year. Situated alongside the River Usk, the 8½ acre complex comprising large adult pool and smaller children's pool with adjoining lawns, became Newport's favourite "out-of-town resort".
