= Riverside, Newport =

Area of Newport, Wales

Riverside (also known as East Usk) is a residential area close to Newport city centre, South Wales.

It lies within the electoral ward of Saint Julian's and to the east is Barnardtown. The area is bounded by the River Usk to the west (hence East Usk) and many houses have views of Newport Castle, Shaftesbury, Crindau and Malpas. Riverside is bounded by Caerleon Road to the west, the M4 motorway to the north and Newport Bridge to the south.

The area includes the Glebelands sports fields, indoor bowls centre and Glan Usk Primary School, which replaced Durham Road Infant School and Durham Road Junior School.
