= Duffryn =

Housing estate in Newport, Wales

Coordinates: 51.56034°N 3.01983°W

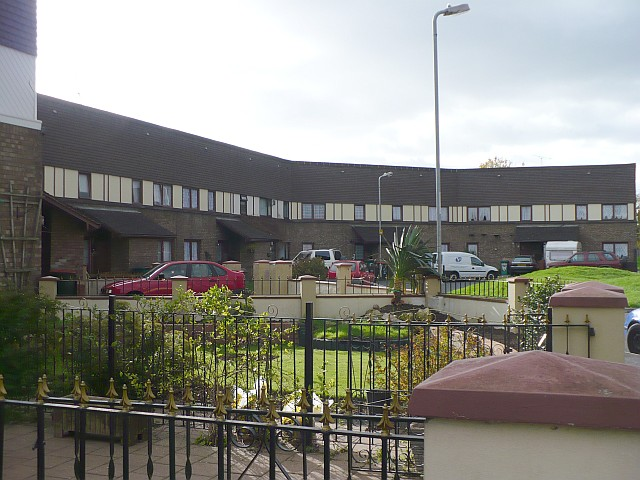
Partridge Way on the Duffryn Estate

Duffryn (Welsh: Dyffryn) is a large housing estate in the southwest of the city of Newport, south Wales comprising a large portion of the Tredegar Park electoral district (ward). Built on land belonging to Tredegar House, it was completed in 1978 and at the time won several awards for its design. The layout of the estate, as viewed from above, is that of long, curved terraces undulating around a central wooded area. Originally a council estate, Duffryn is now a mix of private ownership and Newport City Homes RSL (Registered Social Landlord) properties.

The design of the estate is the result of a council competition. It was won by a consortium committed to the theories of planning devised in the architecture department of Cambridge University in the 1960s. The District Amenities Centre that was planned for the south-west corner of the 96-acre site was never built, so the plan of a largely self-sufficient community was not realised.

Despite the relative recent development of the estate, the name Duffryn is an ancient name for the wider township of the ancient parish of Bassaleg.

There are three secondary schools in Duffryn: John Frost School, St. Joseph's RC High School and the Welsh-medium Ysgol Gyfun Gwent Is Coed. In 2006, John Frost School (known then as Duffryn High School) was the filming location of the Doctor Who episode School Reunion, filmed in late-summer 2005.

The majority of the estate is heated by a district heating system which is fuelled by biomass.
