= Parc-Seymour =

Hamlet in Newport, Wales

Coordinates: 51.62215°N 2.85791°W

Parc-Seymour: Parc-Seymour
- Hamlet
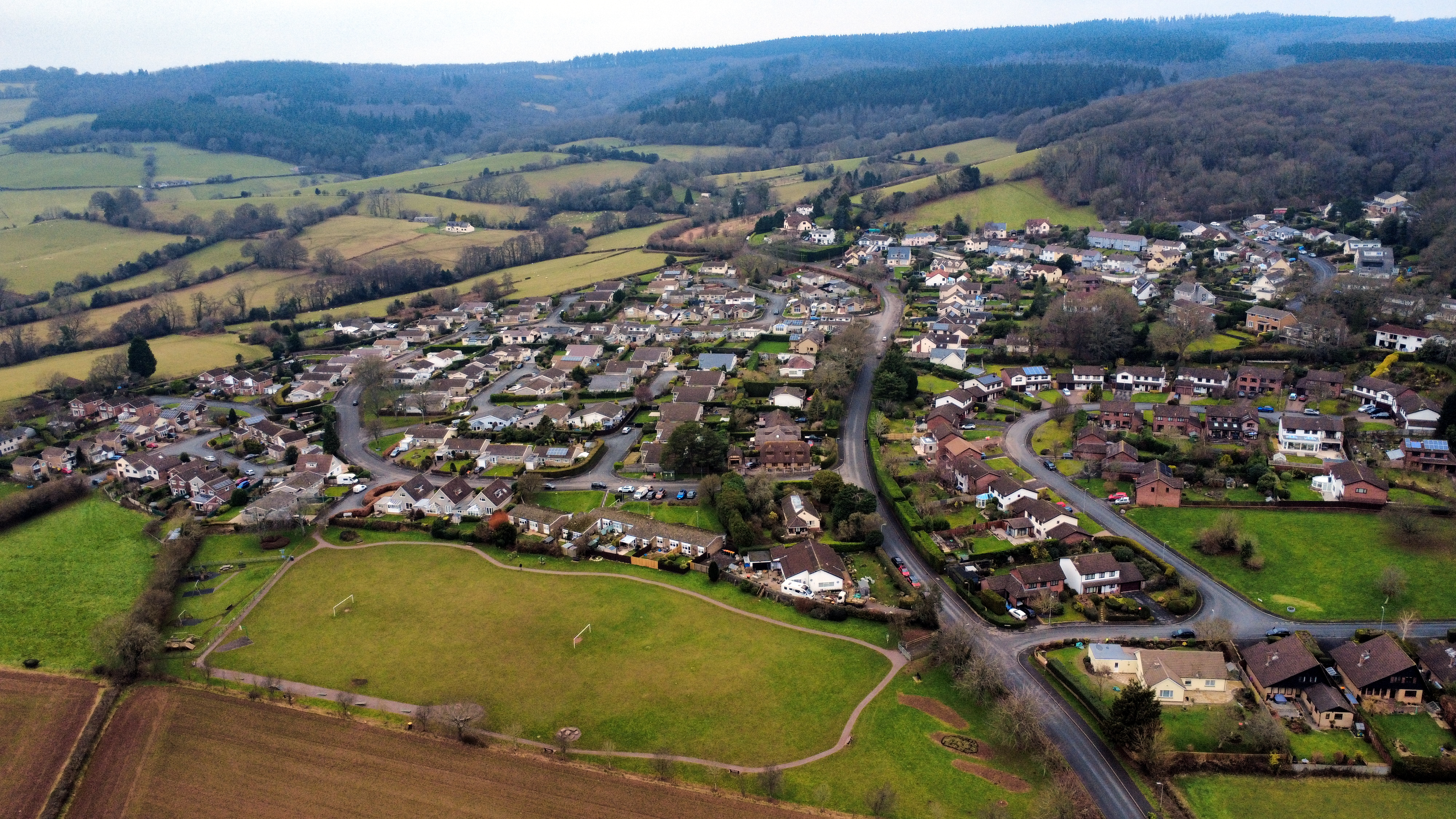
- Parc-Seymour, looking north-northeast from 110 metres.

- Location within Newport
- Community: Penhow
- Principal area: Newport
- Country: Wales
- Sovereign state: United Kingdom
- Police: Gwent
- Fire: South Wales
- Ambulance: Welsh
- UK Parliament: Newport East

Parc-Seymour, is a hamlet in Newport, Wales. It is north of the A48 Newport-Chepstow road, 10 kilometres east-northeast of Newport, within the ancient parish of Penhow, the hamlet of which lies east-southeast of Parc-Seymour.

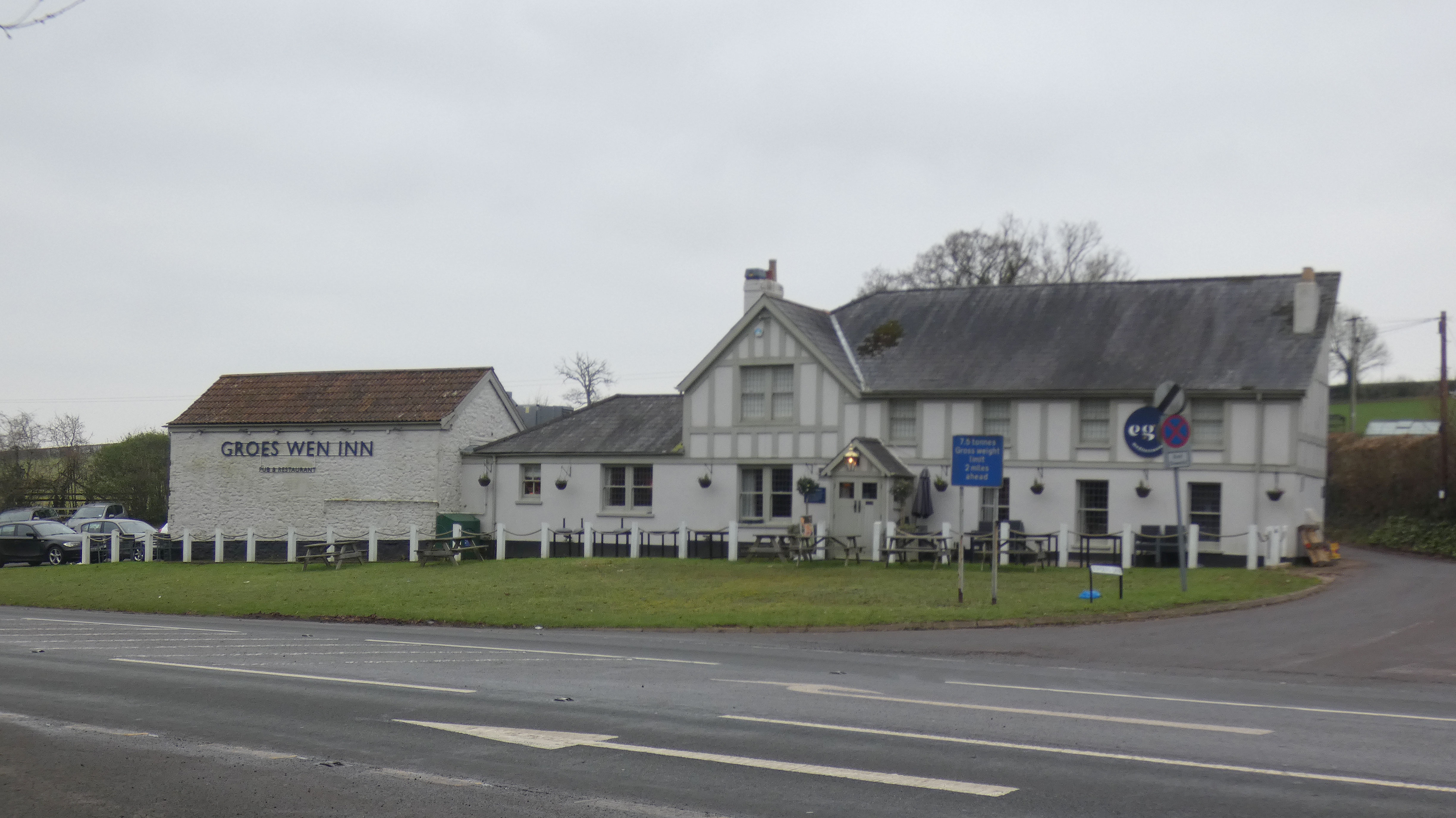
Groes Wen Inn, by the A48 near Parc-Seymour.

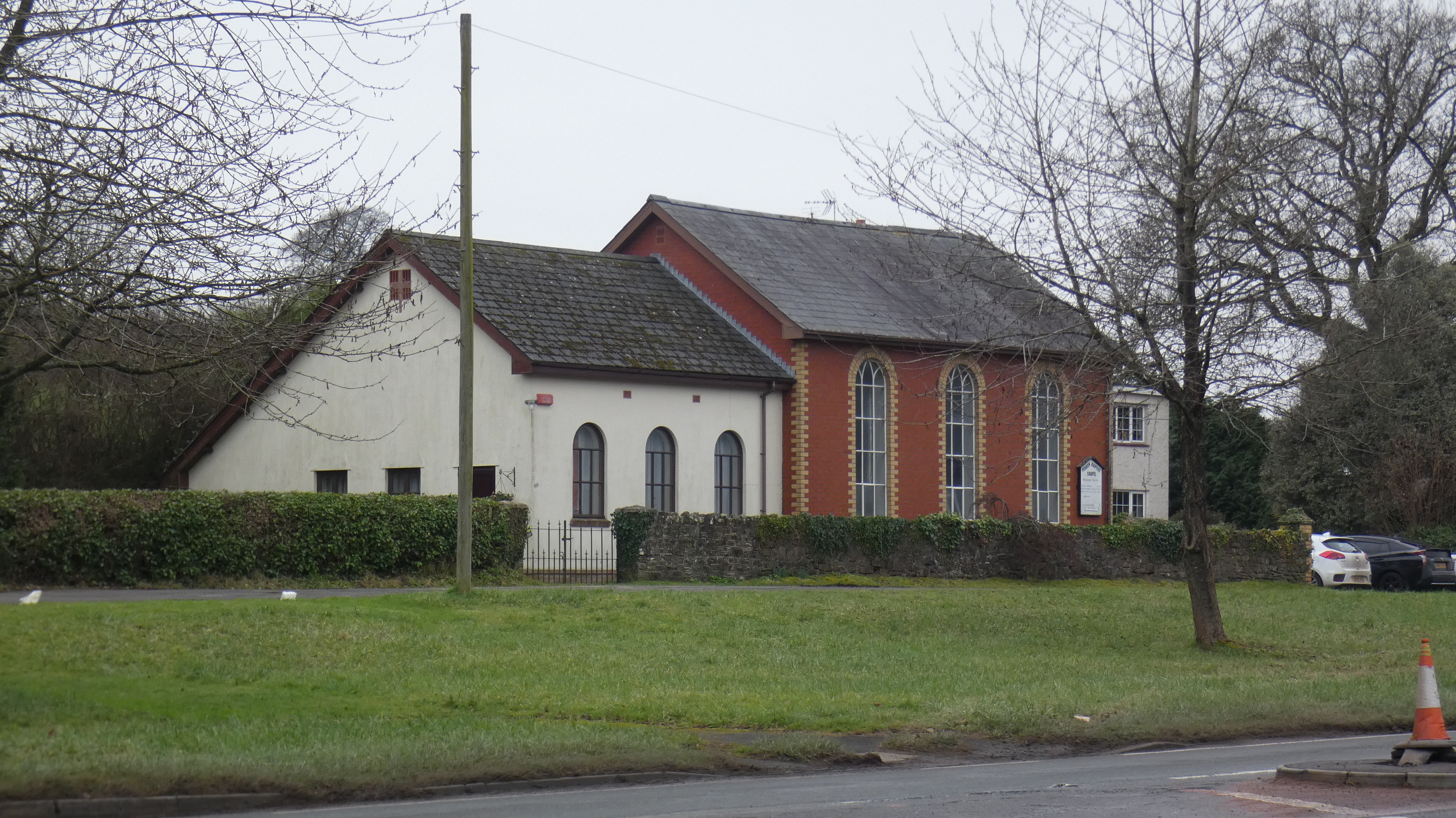
Baptist Church by the A48.

== Etymology ==
The name is a combination of the Welsh word Parc [park] and the name Seymour, after that branch of the family which owned Penhow Castle and its surrounding. The Norman French descendant William de St Maur obtained Penhow and Undy and over time the spelling was corrupted to Seymour.

== Geography ==
Most of the area around the hamlet is sandstone, forming the upland parts known as Kemeys Graig and Bertholeys Graig, to the west and north. Nearly all of the dwellings in the hamlet lie on Brownstones Formation sandstone, formed between 419.2 and 393.3 million years ago during the Devonian period; this bedrock also passes to the south of the A48. A small margin (in the ones to tens of metres) to the north, east and south of the hamlet, underlying a small number of dwellings, is bedrock of Quartz Conglomerate Formation (Forest Of Dean type), sandstone and conglomerate interbedded, formed between 372.2 and 358.9 million years ago during the Devonian period. To the east, northeast, and spreading south, the bedrock is Tintern Sandstone, Devonian and Carboniferous rock between 372.2 and 346.7 million years old. Elevations are from 43 metres in the southwest where the western stream reaches the A48 and 170 metres in Castell-prin wood in the northwest.

== History ==
Northwest of the hamlet are the Castell-prin earthworks, a defended enclosure and a scheduled monument, believed to date from the Iron-Age (location: 51.62721,-2.85387). What is now the A48 through the parish of Penhow followed the route of the old Roman road. Maps from the early 19th century to the mid-1950s show little change in the environment of the hamlet. The road was a turnpike road until the late 19th century (the toll house was by the Rock and Fountain Inn further east). The Groes Wen Inn (also spelt 'Cross-wen' historically) on the A48 was serving the community from 1881, having converted from a country cottage, with a village pound and smithy immediately west of it. Chapel Lodge, 275 metres west, was also there at the time; the current Baptist chapel, 120 metres west of Groes Wen, has been serving over 100 years. The old police house is at the bottom of Greenmeadow lane by the A48.

Late 19th century reports mention the landlord of the Groes Wen Inn being fined for allowing drunkenness, his customers fined for being drunk, one dislocating his arm, criminals charged with using counterfeit coins there and at other stops along the road and drivers charged for leaving carts unattended outside.

Property sales began to pick up in the late 19th and early 20th centuries. Much of the land in the wider area was owned by heirs in the line of the Duke of Beaufort. The 9th duke, Henry Somerset, began to divest himself of this from 1902, including Wentwood Forest, Upper House Farm and Castell-prin wood, and the hill and common of Mynydd-Allt-Tyr-Fâch (next to Wentwood Reservoir).

Properties changed hands over the following decades. Then, from the 1950s, tenders were invited and groups of houses started to be built to the east in the area of Arcade Lane and south of the junction of Duckpool Lane, Wentwood Road, Market Road and Greenmeadow Lane. Building accelerated in the late 1960s, and 1970s. From fewer than fifty new houses in 1970, the area north of what is now Parc-Seymour Park eventually filled with about 200 homes.

== Human geography and local government ==
Parc-Seymour is part of Penhow Community Council in the electoral the ward of Bishton and Langstone, Newport in Newport, in the 'Langstone 2' area which had a population of 1146 in 2011. The crime rate and social deprivation indicators are very low. Student performance is above average for the city of Newport.

The member of parliament for the area is Jessica Morden of the Labour Party, representing the Newport East constituency.
