= Baneswell =

Suburb of Newport, Wales

Coordinates: 51°35′13.61″N 2°59′56.24″W

Baneswell is an inner-city district in the city of Newport, South Wales. It is in the electoral ward of Stow Hill, and located next to the city centre and Newport railway station.
