= Castleton, Newport =

Hamlet in Newport, Wales

Coordinates: 51.545525°N 3.078016°W

Castleton: Welsh: Cas-bach
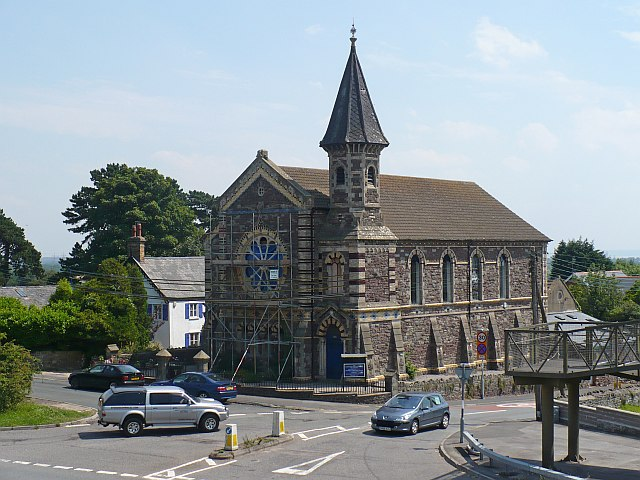
- Castleton Baptist Chapel

- Location within Newport
- OS grid reference: ST253835
- Principal area: Newport
- Country: Wales
- Sovereign state: United Kingdom
- Post town: CARDIFF
- Postcode district: CF3
- Dialling code: 01633
- Police: Gwent
- Fire: South Wales
- Ambulance: Welsh
- UK Parliament: Newport West
- Senedd Cymru – Welsh Parliament: Newport West

Castleton (Welsh: Cas-bach) is a hamlet in the city of Newport, South Wales.

== Location ==
Castleton is in the Marshfield ward on the A48 dual carriageway located between the city of Newport to the east and Cardiff to the west.

== Amenities ==
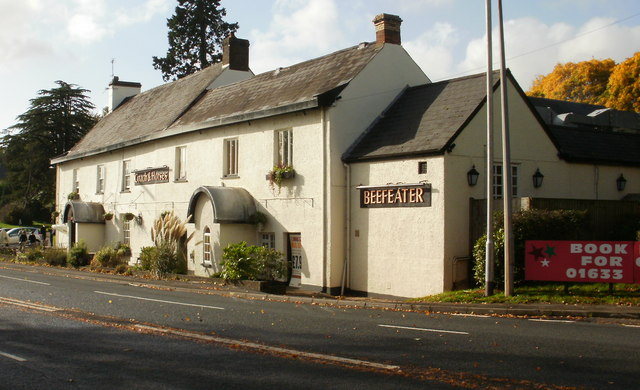
Coach and Horses pub/restaurant

Castleton has a Baptist chapel. At a meeting at the chapel in 1816, it was agreed to establish the first Welsh Baptist Chapel in Newport, which was subsequently built on Charles Street. This building is now used as a business and Church meetings are held at Gateway Baptist in Marshfield nearby. There is a filling station with a cafe and deli next door. Across the road, is the Coach and Horses, a pub/restaurant and hotel.

== Transport ==
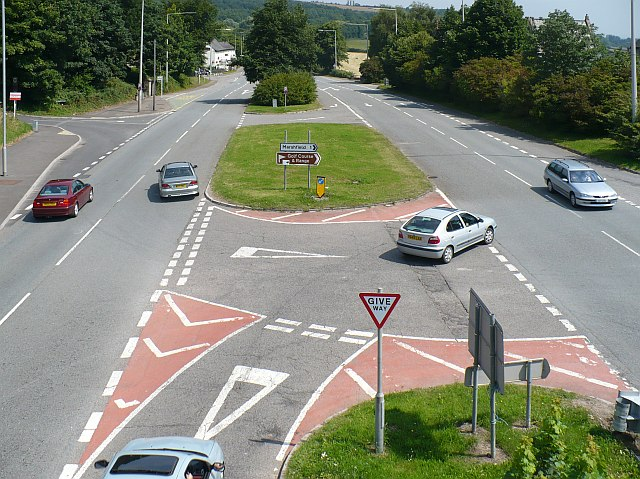
A48 dual carriageway passing through Castleton

The A48 dual carriageway is the main road through Castleton. The A48(M) motorway passes close to the north of the village. There are no motorway junctions on this short link between (M4) Junction 29 and Junction 29A at St Mellons.

The Great Western Railway station at nearby Marshfield acted as a rail connection, eastwards to Newport and onwards through the Severn Tunnel, terminating at London Paddington, and westwards to Cardiff and Fishguard Harbour. Closed since 1959, long before the Beeching cuts took effect, the nearest rail station today is Pye Corner.
