= Ringland, Newport =

Ringland
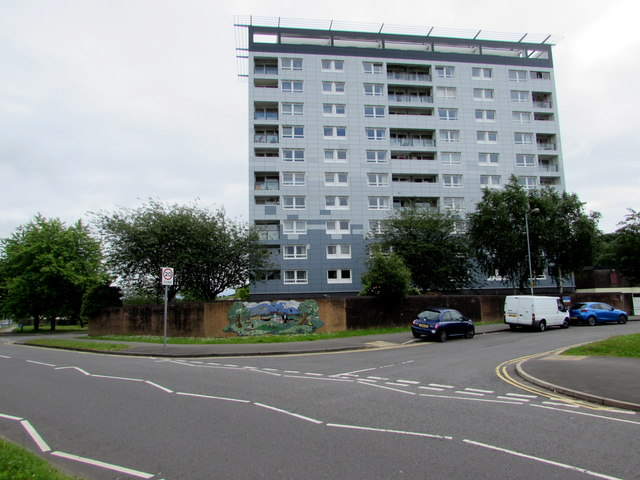
- Milton Court, Ringland in June 2016

- Location within Newport
- Population: 8,550 (2011 census)
- OS grid reference: ST352888
- Principal area: Newport
- Country: Wales
- Sovereign state: United Kingdom
- Post town: NEWPORT
- Postcode district: NP18, NP19
- Dialling code: 01633; Maindee exchange
- Police: Gwent
- Fire: South Wales
- Ambulance: Welsh
- UK Parliament: Newport East
- Senedd Cymru – Welsh Parliament: Newport East
- List of places UK Wales Newport 51.59430°N 2.93686°W Map of the community

Ringland is a community (civil parish) and electoral ward of the city of Newport, South Wales.

The community is bounded by Ringland Way to the east, the southern boundary of Llanwern High School to the south, Balfe Rd, Aberthaw Rd, Ringland Circle, Ringwood Avenue, across Chepstow Rd, Mountbatten close and behind Chiltern Close and Glanwern Grove to the west and the M4 motorway to the north.

Most of the houses and flats and shopping centre were built by the local council during the 1950s and 1960s, most of houses have generous sized gardens. Ringland is close to junction 24 of the motorway also 12 minutes drive from Newport Railway Station. Ringland has green spaces around the area including Ringland Wood run by the Woodland Trust.

Plans were announced in 2017 to demolish maisonettes in Ringland Centre and Cot Farm and replace them with modern homes, designed to a masterplan by Powell Dobson architects and developed by Newport City Homes.

It is home to the 5-star Celtic Manor Resort on the north side of the M4. There were plans proposed in 2015 to invest in improvements to the shopping centre.

In 2017 a permanent site for travellers or gypsies was created on Hartridge Farm Road. Archaeological remains dating from the Iron Age and Roman periods were found during the development.

== Local government ==
The area is governed by the Newport City Council. Ringland is an electoral ward of the city council, coterminous with the community, represented by three city councillors.
