= Lliswerry =

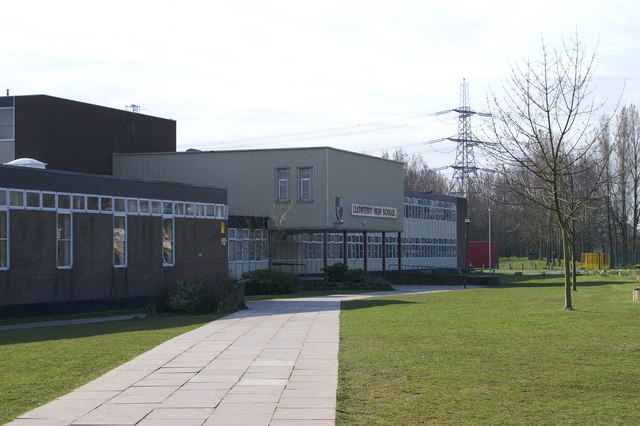
- Lliswerry High School

- Location within Newport
- Population: 12,069
- OS grid reference: ST334870
- Principal area: Newport
- Country: Wales
- Sovereign state: United Kingdom
- Post town: NEWPORT
- Postcode district: NP19
- Dialling code: 01633
- Police: Gwent
- Fire: South Wales
- Ambulance: Welsh
- UK Parliament: Newport East
- Senedd Cymru – Welsh Parliament: Newport East
- List of places UK Wales Newport 51.57791°N 2.96249°W Map of the community

Lliswerry (Welsh: Llyswyry), or Liswerry, is an electoral district (ward) and community of the city of Newport, South Wales. The area is governed by Newport City Council. It is the largest community/ward in the city.

== History and origins ==
Liswerry/Lliswerry is an anglicised version of the Welsh place name Llyswyry translating to Maiden's Court. (Llys - Court, Gwyryf > Wyryf > Wyry - Maiden). It is believed that there was a manor house in the area belonging to the Welsh King of Brycheiniog. His daughter had connections to the manor/court. It was likely that the house was in the area of Traston Road today.

The long-derelict King public house on Somerton Road was sold in May 2013. Originally known as the King of Prussia, the pub was used as a base by Newport County; before their ground, Somerton Park, was equipped with changing rooms, teams would change into their playing kit at the pub prior to starting matches, and wash their kit there after games.

== Community boundaries ==
The community is bounded by the River Usk to the west, Lilleshall Street and Telford Street to the northeast, the Great Western main line to the north, the original western end of Llanwern steelworks and Meadows Road to the east, and Nash Road, Traston Road, Corporation Road and Stephenson Street to the south. Lliswerry Ward is composed of both the Lliswerry and Nash communities.

== Schools and colleges ==
The ward is the site of the City of Newport Campus of Coleg Gwent (commonly referred to as 'Nash College') and the Newport International Sports Village. Lliswerry High School is adjacent to the college campus. Lliswerry also has a primary school, further north along Nash Road.

On Jenkins Street, there is also St Andrew's Primary School.

== Churches ==
Lliswerry has four churches: St. Andrew's Church in Wales church, in the benefice of Newport, Maindee and Newport, Lliswerry, is situated in Somerton Road; Lliswerry Baptist Church in Camperdown Road; Saint Patrick's Catholic Church in Cromwell Road, the only parish administered by the Rosminians in Newport; and St Philip's Church in Wales church in Jenkins Street.

== Other amenities ==
There is a Post Office at 63, Somerton Road and a medical centre on Fallowfield Drive.

Lliswery Pond was formed, near the railway line, when quarrying excavations struck an underground stream which flooded that area. At its deepest point the pond is 25 feet (7.6 m) and it is well-stocked with fish, including large pike. The pond was refurbished in 2008 and is maintained by many enthusiasts, as well as the local angling association, Alway Community Association and Newport City Council.

== Sport ==
The suburb is also home to the Newport International Sports Village and Newport Stadium which, from 1994 to 2012, was the home ground of the Newport County football team. Lliswerry A.F.C. are a football team which currently plays in the Gwent County League.

Lliswerry Runners have club sessions which are organised into six groups and have a junior club which began in 2016.
