= High Cross, Newport =

Suburb of Newport, Wales

Coordinates: 51°35′17″N 3°02′25″W

High Cross is a suburb of the city of Newport, Wales, and forms part of the community (parish) of Rogerstone.

The majority of the housing in the area was built in the 1930s on land formerly owned by the Tredegar Estate (the Morgans of Tredegar House) which at the time was outside the boundaries of the county borough of Newport.

A great deal of housing was added in the 1950s and 1960s, some of which is still local authority housing. A small amount of housing close to the Monmouthshire Canal predates the 20th century.

== Amenities ==
Separated from the city centre by the M4 motorway, the area includes the Fourteen Locks, a flight of canal locks on the Crumlin arm of the Monmouthshire Canal. There is a large open area known as Cefn Wood at the north end of High Cross.

Local amenities include High Cross Primary School

St. Anne's church and hall, part of the parish of Bassaleg, closed in 2020 (Church in Wales). The site has reopened as High Cross Community Hall and is run by 28th Newport Scout Group.
