= Rhiwderin =

Village in Newport, Wales

Coordinates: 51.58148°N 3.06937°W

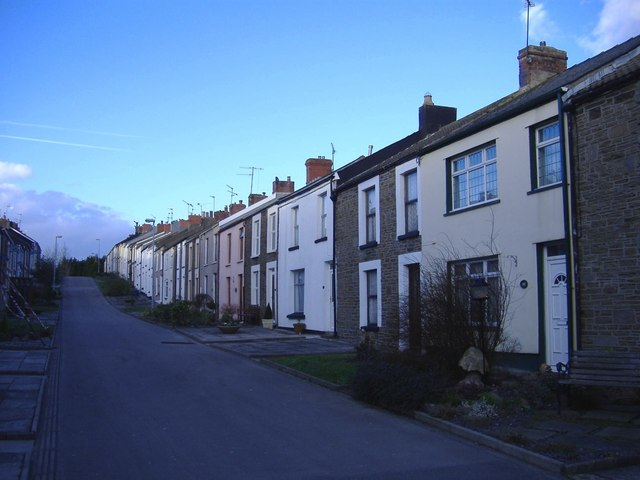
Tredegar Street

Rhiwderin (Welsh: Rhiwderyn) is a small village in the west of the city of Newport, South Wales.

It lies in the community parish and electoral ward of Graig.

The original village lies across a level crossing alongside the Ebbw Valley Railway and off the A468 road. There are additional houses on the other side of the main road known as Rhiwderin Heights which have almost merged the village with neighbouring Bassaleg.

The Pentrepoeth School is the local primary school in the area. Rhiwderin Community Centre is located in the former village school and administered by Graig Community Council.

The village was served by Rhiwderin railway station until 1954. Rhiwderin lies on the route of the old Brecon and Merthyr Tydfil Junction Railway line. The line now ends at Machen Quarry and carries only freight trains. The trackbed from Machen to Caerphilly is now part of National Cycle Route 4. Then reopening of the line for passenger traffic is being considered as part of the South East Wales Metro.

There are two places of worship in Rhiwderin:

- Rhiwderin Congregational Chapel
- Rhiwderin Free Presbyterian Church
