= Beechwood, Newport =

Coordinates: 51.59136°N 2.96711°W

Beechwood
- Population: 7,779 (2019 census)
- OS grid reference: ST331885
- Principal area: Newport
- Country: Wales
- Sovereign state: United Kingdom
- Post town: NEWPORT
- Postcode district: NP19
- Dialling code: 01633; Savoy exchange
- Police: Gwent
- Fire: South Wales
- Ambulance: Welsh
- UK Parliament: Newport East
- Senedd Cymru – Welsh Parliament: Newport East
- List of places UK Wales Newport Map of the community

Beechwood is a community (civil parish) and coterminous electoral ward (division) of the city of Newport.

The community is bounded by the River Usk to the north, Renoir Road, Beechwood Road, Chepstow Road and Windsor Road to the east, the Great Western Main Line to the south, and Victoria Avenue, Norfolk Road, Avalon Drive, behind Reynolds Close, Badminton Road, and east of The Moorings to the west.

The area contains, and is named after, Beechwood Park.

== Governance ==
Since 1995 Beechwood has been a ward to Newport County Borough Council and Newport City Council, electing three city councillors. The ward is coterminous with the community.

The ward has elected Labour councillors, apart from 2004 to 2012 when the ward returned three Liberal Democrats. Though in September 2021 Labour councillor, Graham Berry, left Labour and joined the Conservative Party after he was not re-selected to stand for Labour at the May 2022 elections. Three Labour councillors were returned at the 2022 elections.
