= 01633 =

Telephone area code of Newport, United Kingdom

Coordinates: 51.5937°N 2.9987°W

United Kingdom area code for Newport
- National calling: 01633
- International calling: +44 1633
- Conservation: Yes
- Active since: 16 April 1995
- Previous code: 0633
- Number format: 01633 xxxxxx

Coverage
- Area served: Newport; Cwmbran; Machen; Magor

The 01633 telephone area code covers the city of Newport and surrounding areas in the United Kingdom. Before PhONEday the area code was 0633, which was originally dialled as "0NE3" where the "NE" were formed from the first two letters of NEwport on the telephone dial. In common with all other British area codes the initial '0' is a trunk prefix that is dropped when dialling from abroad.

== Coverage ==
The 14 exchanges listed in the table below form the 01633 code area as of 2012:

Exchange		Premises	
OLO code	Name	Residential	Business
SWNE/EX	Newport Savoy	20,967	1,620
SWNE/CH	Newport Chartist	8,852	190
SWMDE	Maindee	12,003	434
SWRWI	Rhiwderin	6,660	110
SWCAA	Caerleon	4,161	161
SWMES	Maesglas	3,666	90
SWUWN	Llanwern	2,153	62
SWCTE	Castleton	1,564	54
SWPHX	Penhow	786	47
SWMAD	Machen	1,227	28
SWRDX	Risca	5,009	234
SWCRS	Cwmbran	20,268	905
SWTUC	Tredunnock	355	25
SWMGR	Magor	2,477	99

== History ==
The Group switching centre (GSC) for the Newport charge group was the Savoy exchange. This exchange alongside the Chartist, Maindee and Maesglas exchanges formed the Newport linked numbering scheme whereby local numbers could be dialled directly and with the STD code 0633. The surrounding dependent exchanges could be accessed via local codes and longer STD codes based on 0633.

=== Dependent exchanges ===
Smaller exchanges around the GSC were parented onto it. From them the digit 9 was dialled to access the GSC. The codes from the GSC to the dependent exchanges are listed in the table below:

Exchange	Local code	Original STD code
Cwmbran	3	063 33
Llanwern	41	063 341
Caerleon	42	063 342
Rhiwderin	43	063 343
Risca	44	063 344
Penhow	45	063 345
Machen	46	063 346
Magor	47	063 347
Castleton	48	063 348
Tredunnock	49	063 349

To dial from one dependent exchange to another one first dialled 9 to access the GSC then dialled the local code to the destination exchange. Thus a caller from Machen to Magor would dial 947 before the subscriber's number and a caller from Risca to Cwmbran would dial 93. A caller to a Newport number in the linked numbering scheme would simply dial 9.

== Changes ==
Over time the local codes were abolished and the dependent exchanges became part of the linked numbering scheme. This meant the 3, 4 and 5-digit numbers became 6-digit numbers by means of a prefix that was unique in the 0633 code area.

- By 1983 Llanwern 4-digit numbers (2000–3999) were prefixed with 41.
- Caerleon 4-digit numbers were prefixed by 42. All were 6-digit by 1976.
- Rhiwderin 4-digit numbers were prefixed by 89.
- Risca 3-digit numbers were prefixed by 600 and 4-digit numbers prefixed by 61. All were 6-digit by 1974.
- Penhow 3-digit numbers were prefixed with 400. All were 6-digit by 1983.
- Machen 3-digit numbers were prefixed with 440. All were 6-digit by 1983.
- Magor 3-digit numbers were prefixed with 880. All were 6-digit by 1983.
- Castleton 3-digit numbers were prefixed with 680. All were 6-digit by 1979.
- Tredunnock 3-digit numbers were prefixed with 450.
- Cwmbran 4-digit numbers (2000–5999) were prefixed with 48 and 5-digit numbers (60000–79999) were prefixed with 8.

The remaining 5-digit numbers in the Newport area (50000–59999 and 62000–69999) were prefixed with 2 in 1990. Since then all numbers have been 6-digit and the previous prefixes have been reused by other communications providers.
