= Feudal barony of Hatch Beauchamp =

English feudal barony

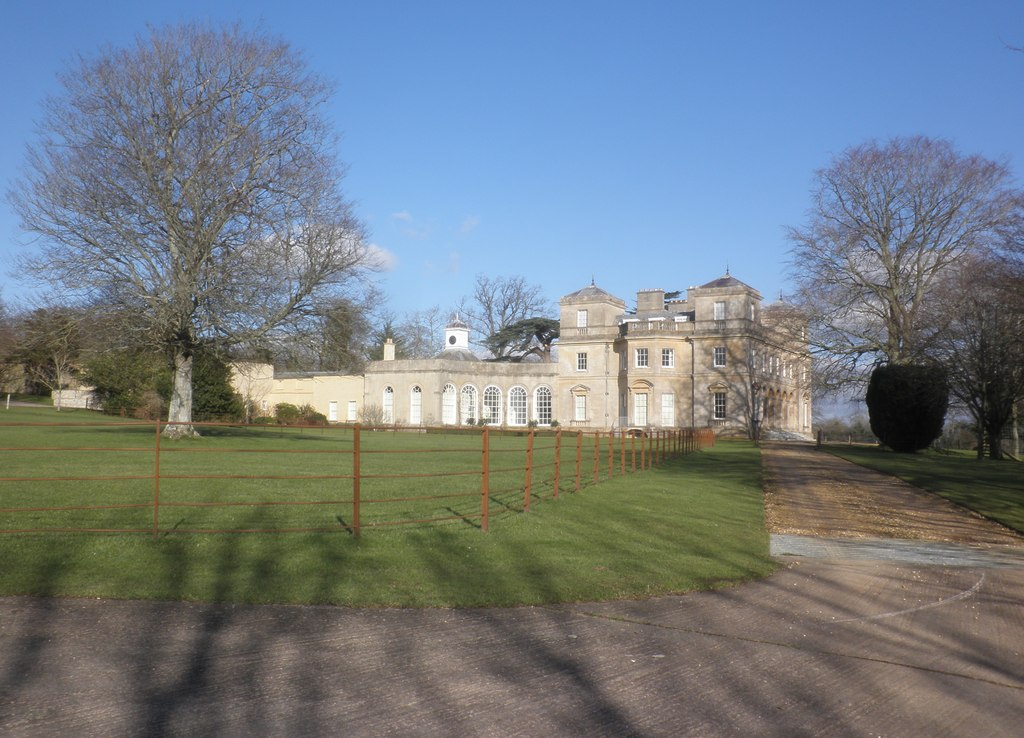
Hatch Court, built in 1755 on the site of the mediaeval fortified manor house of the de Beauchamp family. View from west

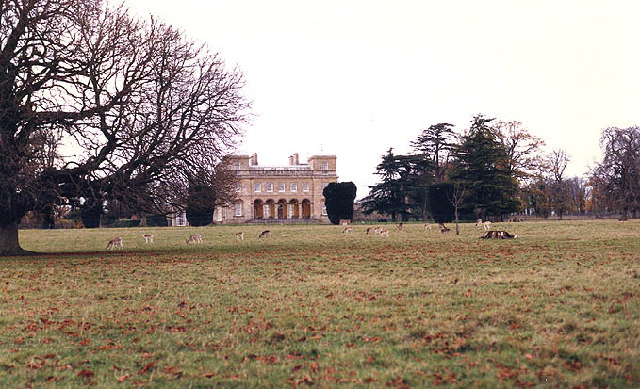
Hatch Court, main entrance front (south front), viewed in 1989 from within the surviving deer park

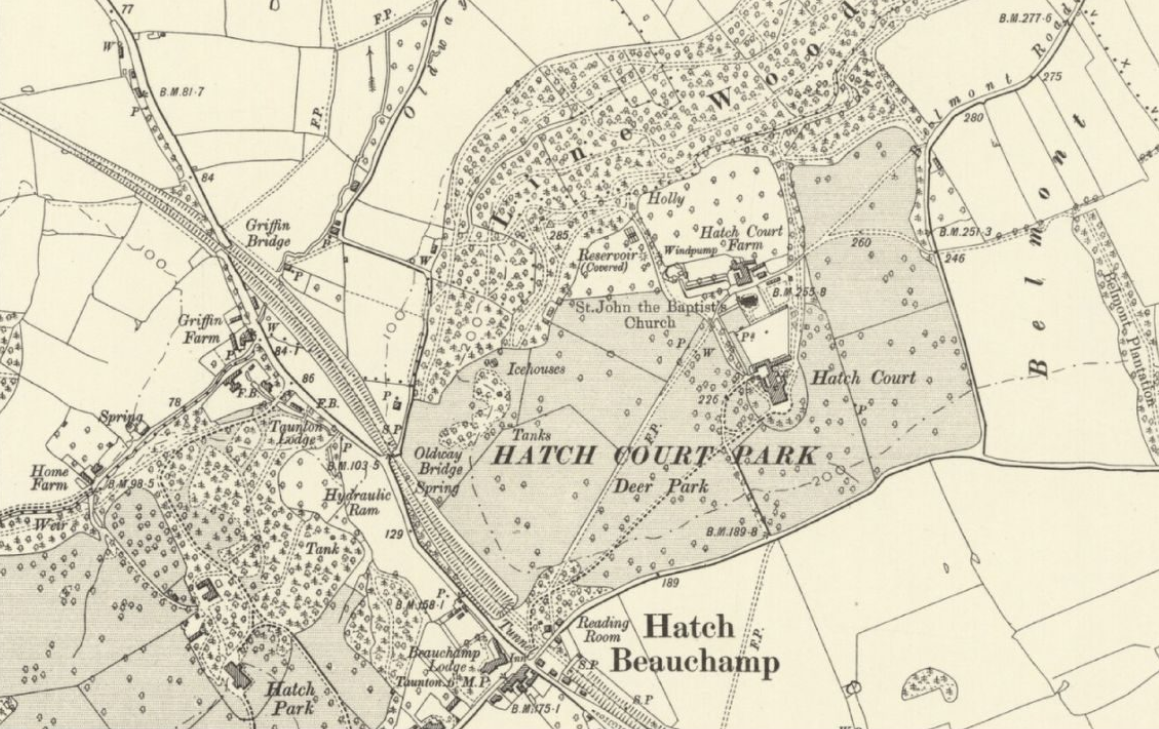
1886 Ordnance Survey map showing Hatch Court, the deer park and the ancient parish church of St John the Baptist (to the immediate north of the house). Before 1886 the park was bisected by the Great Western Railway Taunton to Chard branch, closed and dismantled in 1964 during the Beeching cuts. Also in the mid-20th c. bisected by the A358 road, since rebuilt one kilometer westwards, now connecting the A303 trunk road and the M5 motorway

The feudal barony of Hatch Beauchamp or honour of Hatch Beauchamp was an English feudal barony with its caput at the manor of Hatch Beauchamp in Somerset. The site of the mediaeval manor house, to the immediate south of the ancient parish church of St John the Baptist, is today occupied by Hatch Court, a grade I listed mansion built in about 1755 in the Palladian style.

== Nomenclature ==
The Saxon word Hache signifies "gateway" and it is believed Hatch in Somerset formed the gateway to the royal hunting forest of Neroche. The small River Rag, which flows through Hache, was the northern boundary of the forest.

== Descent ==
=== Saxon era ===
Hache was held from King Edward the Confessor (died 1066) by the Saxons Godric, Godwin and Bollo, as stated in the Domesday Book of 1086.

=== Norman era ===
==== Robert, Count of Mortain ====
The Domesday Book of 1086 records Hache as one of the many holdings in-chief of Robert, Count of Mortain (c. 1031 – 1090), the half-brother of King William the Conqueror, whose tenant there was Robert Fitz Ivo, known as "Robert the Constable". On the rebellion of the Count of Mortain against King William's younger son and successor to the English throne, his lands escheated to the crown, and were soon thereafter re-granted to the de Beauchamp family from Normandy.

=== de Beauchamp ===
The early history of the de Beauchamp family of Hatch is "by no means clear".

- Robert I de Beauchamp (fl. 1092) in 1092 witnessed a charter.
- Robert II de Beauchamp (fl. 1158) witnessed a Somerset charter c. 1150, and is again recorded in the Somerset Pipe Roll in 1158. He was possibly the "Robert de Beauchamp" who was Sheriff of Somerset and Dorset between 1176 and 1181. In the Cartae Baronum return of 1166 a certain Robert de Beauchamp certified that he held of the King in-chief, 17 knights' fees, referred to as the "honour of Robert Beauchamp in Somerset and Dorset", 2 held in demesne and 15 sub-enfeoffed to tenants.
- Robert III de Beauchamp (died 1195) witnessed a charter in 1185. He left no male progeny, only a daughter and sole heiress, who was the wife of Simon de Vautort (died 1199), of which name were the feudal barons of Trematon in Cornwall.

=== de Vautort ("de Beauchamp") ===
Arms of Beauchamp of Hatch, adopted at the start of the age of heraldry, (c. 1200 – 1215): Vair. These arms suggested to Sanders (1960) that the family of Beauchamp of Hatch was unrelated to the family of Beauchamp, Earl of Warwick from 1267, which bore arms: Gules, a fesse between six cross crosslets or This however ignores the fact that the families may have split from a common root in the 11th or 12th centuries and thus naturally had adopted different arms in about 1200

==== Robert de Vautort/IV "de Beauchamp" (c. 1191 – 1251) ====
Robert de Vautort (c. 1191 – 1251), alias "Robert IV de Beauchamp", son and heir of Simon de Vautort (died 1199) by his wife the heiress of de Beauchamp. He was aged about 8 at his father's death and became a ward of King John, who granted the wardship to his chamberlain Hubert de Burgh, 1st Earl of Kent (died 1243). He adopted the surname "de Beauchamp" in lieu of his patronymic, and on reaching his majority of 21 he became seized of the Honour of Beauchamp.

==== Robert V de Beauchamp (died 1264) ====
Robert V de Beauchamp (died 1264), son and heir, was summoned on many occasions by King Henry III to perform the military service required by his feudal tenure per baroniam, in Scotland and Wales. he married Alice de Mohun, daughter of Reginald II de Mohun (1206–1258), of Dunster Castle in Somerset, feudal baron of Dunster.

==== John I de Beauchamp (died 1283) ====
John I de Beauchamp (died 1283), son and heir, who married Cecily de Vivonne/de Forz (died 1320), one of the four daughters and co-heiresses of William de Vivonne/de Forz (died 1259), who held a one-half moiety of the feudal barony of Curry Mallet in Somerset. Cecily thus inherited a one-eighth share of the barony of Curry Malet. He served as Governor of Carmarthen Castle and of Cardigan Castle, both in Wales. John built a manor house at his other seat of Stoke-sub-Hamdon. His landholdings included the manors of Marston Magna and Shepton Malet in Somerset. He was summoned to join the king's army at Worcester with horse and arms to combat the rebellious Prince Llywelyn (died 1240) of Wales. He died at Hatch, Somerset on 24 October 1283 and was buried in the Chapel of St. Nicholas in the church of Stoke-sub-Hamdon, Somerset on 31 October 1283.

==== John II de Beauchamp, 1st Baron Beauchamp (1274–1336) ====
John II de Beauchamp, 1st Baron Beauchamp (1274–1336), son and heir, received in 1333 from King Edward III a royal licence to crenellate his mansion at Hatch. He served as Governor of Bridgwater Castle in Somerset and fought in the Scottish wars. He received regular writs to attend the king in Parliament, by which in 1299 he was created a baron by writ under the title "Baron Beauchamp de Somerset".

==== John III de Beauchamp, 2nd Baron Beauchamp (1306–1343) ====
John III de Beauchamp, 2nd Baron Beauchamp (1306–1343), son and heir, who fought in the wars in France and attended Parliament from 1337 to 1342. In 1301 he was granted a royal licence to hold weekly markets on Thursdays and also a fair within the manor of Hatch Beauchamp.

==== John IV de Beauchamp, 3rd Baron Beauchamp (1330–1361) ====
John IV de Beauchamp, 3rd Baron Beauchamp (1330–1361), son and heir. He married Lady Alice Beauchamp, daughter of Sir Thomas de Beauchamp, 11th Earl of Warwick (who was of no apparent kinship)) by his wife Katherine Mortimer. The marriage was without progeny and thus the barony by writ became abeyant. The co-heiresses to the feudal barony of Hatch and its lands were his three aunts, the most richly endowed of whom was Cecily de Beauchamp (c. 1321 – 1394), wife of Roger Seymour, of whose share the capital manor of Hatch formed a part.

=== Seymour ===
Arms of Seymour: Gules, two wings conjoined in lure or

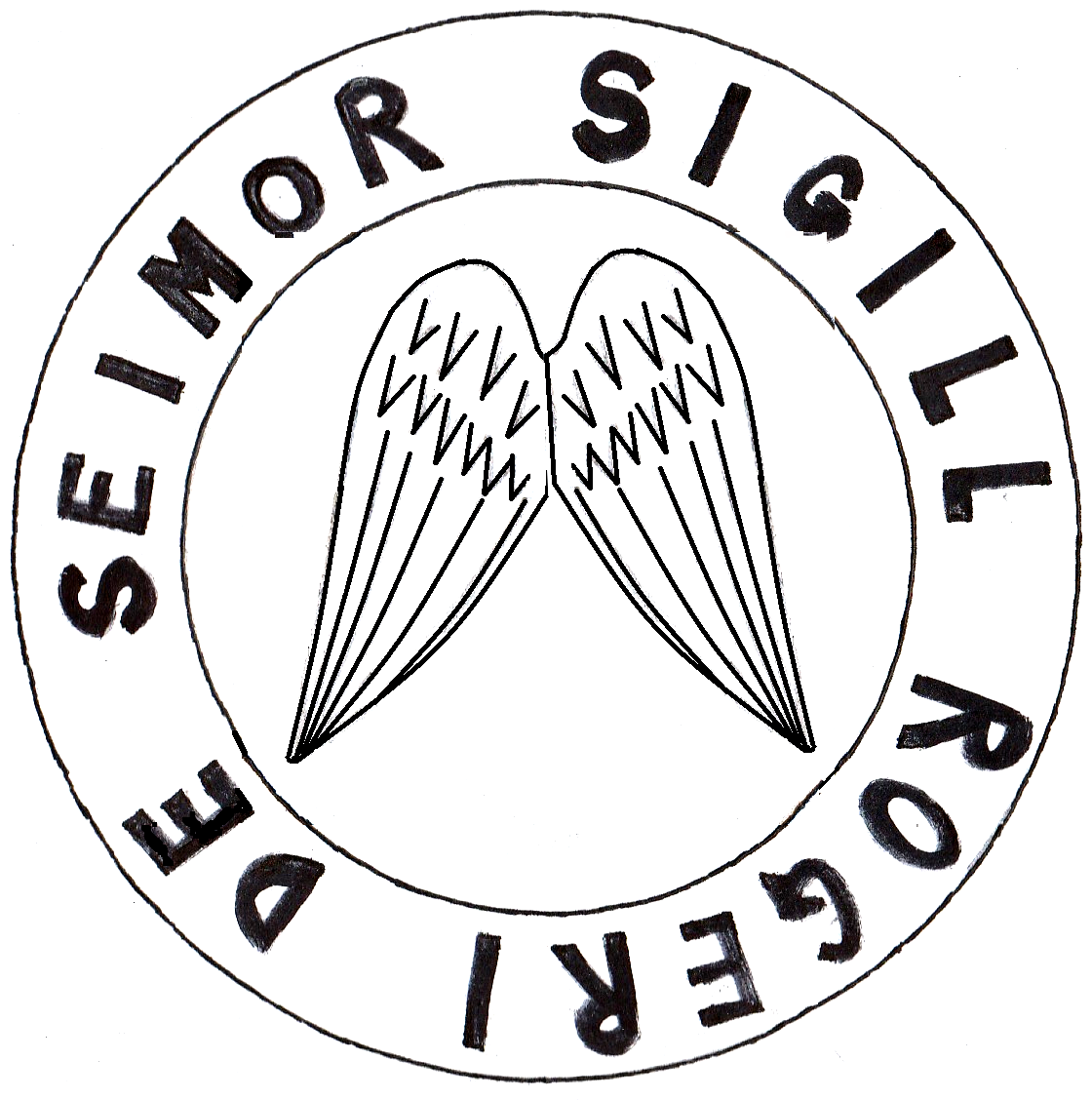
2Recreation of seal reportedly used by Roger de Seymour (died c. 1299) of Undy and Penhow Castle, as reported by the Duchess of Cleveland in her Battle Abbey Roll (1889)

The Seymour family (anciently de St. Maur) of Hatch is earliest recorded seated at Penhow Castle in Glamorgan in the 12th century. The parish church of Penhow is dedicated to St Maur. It should however be differentiated from the Anglo-Norman "baronial family" named St Maur, created Baron St Maur by writ in 1314, who bore different armorials (Argent, two chevrons gules) and which originated at the manor of St. Maur, near Avranches, in Normandy.

The ancestor of the "baronial St Maurs" was Wido de St Maur (died pre-1086) who came to England during the Norman Conquest of 1066, whose son William FitzWido is recorded in the Domesday Book of 1086 as a substantial tenant of Geoffrey Bishop of Coutances, and who held a feudal barony with lands in Somerset, Wiltshire and Gloucester, with ten manors in Somersetshire (of which Portishead was one). He made conquests in Wales in about 1090, which his family afterwards held.

No conclusive evidence exists to confirm the "baronial St Maurs" and the "Seymours of Hatch" as derived from a common stock, however Camden believed this to be most probable. The two families adopted different arms at the start of the age of heraldry, c. 1200 – 1215, with the "baronial St Maurs" bearing: Argent, two chevrons gules. Certainly the "baronial St Maurs" died out in the male line in 1409 when their heir became Baron Zouche of Haryngworth, namely William la Zouche, 5th Baron Zouche (c. 1402 – 1462), whose son was William la Zouche, 6th Baron Zouche, 7th Baron St Maur (c. 1432 – 1468/9). One of the heirs of the St Maur/Zouche family was the Bampfield family of Poltimore in Devon (later Baron Poltimore) which inherited the Devon manor of North Molton from the Zouche family.

==== Sir Roger I Seymour (1314 – c. 1361) ====
Sir Roger I Seymour (alias St. Maur) (1314-pre-1361), born at Even Swindon, Wiltshire, husband of Cecily de Beauchamp (died 1393), heiress of Hatch Beauchamp. Cecily de Beauchamp inherited the manors of Hatch Beauchamp, Shepton Beauchamp, Merryfield, Ilton or 'Murifield', and one third of the manor of Shepton Mallet, Somerset, the manors of Boultbery and Haberton, Devon, of Dorton, Buckinghamshire, and of Little Haw, Suffolk. She survived her husband and remarried secondly on 14 September 1368 to Sir Gilbert Turberville of Coity Castle, Glamorgan.

==== Sir William Seymour (c. 1342 – 1391) ====
Sir William Seymour (c. 1342 – 1391). He served under the Black Prince in Gascogny in 1362. He resided mainly at his manor of Undy (alias Woundy), near Caldicot in Monmouthshire. He married Margaret de Blackburn, daughter of Simon de Blackburn.

==== Roger II Seymour (c. 1367/70 – 1420) ====
Roger II Seymour (c. 1367/70 – 1420), who married Maud Esturmy (alias Esturmi, etc.), a daughter and co-heiress of Sir William Esturmy (died 1427), of Wolfhall in Wiltshire, Speaker of the House of Commons and hereditary Warden of Savernake Forest in Wiltshire. Following his wife's inheritance, he moved his principal seat from Undy to Wolfhall.

==== Sir John Seymour (c. 1395/1402 – 1464) ====
Sir John Seymour(c. 1395/1402 – 1464), son and heir, of Wulfhall in Savernake Forest, Wiltshire, and of Hatch Beauchamp. He served as Member of Parliament for Ludgershall in 1422 and Knight of the Shire for Wiltshire in 1435, 1439, and 1445 He was also High Sheriff of Wiltshire in 1431–1432, having previously served as High Sheriff of Hampshire. He married Isabel William (alias Williams) (died 1486), daughter of Mark William, (alias William MacWilliam or Williams of Gloucestershire), a merchant and Mayor of Bristol,

==== John Seymour (died 1491) ====
John Seymour (died 1491), grandson and heir, son of John Seymour (1425–1463) who pre-deceased his father. His first wife was Elizabeth Darrell (born c. 1451), daughter of Sir George Darrell (died c. 1474) of Littlecote, Wiltshire, by his wife Margaret Stourton (born c. 1433), a daughter of John Stourton, 1st Baron Stourton and of Margery or Marjory Wadham, daughter of Sir John Wadham.

==== Sir John Seymour (1474–1536) ====
Sir John Seymour (1474–1536), eldest son from 1st marriage, knighted in 1497 after the Battle of Deptford Bridge, the father of Queen Jane Seymour (1508–1537), 3rd wife of King Henry VIII.

==== Edward Seymour, 1st Duke of Somerset (c. 1500 – 1552) ====
Arms of Edward Seymour, 1st Duke of Somerset: Quarterly, 1st and 4th: Or, on a pile gules between six fleurs-de-lys azure three lions of England (special grant by his nephew King Edward VI); 2nd and 3rd: Gules, two wings conjoined in lure or (Seymour) These arms concede the positions of greatest honour, the 1st & 4th quarters, to a special grant of arms incorporating the fleurs-de-lys and lions of the royal arms of Plantagenet

Edward Seymour, 1st Duke of Somerset, KG, (c. 1500 – 1552), eldest son and heir, uncle of King Edward VI (1547–1553) and Lord Protector of England (1547–49). in 1536 on his sister's marriage to King Henry VIII, he was created Viscount Beauchamp of Hache and in 1537 was created by the same king Earl of Hertford. He received his dukedom together with the subsidiary title Baron Seymour on the accession of his nephew to the throne in 1547. In 1531 he had served as Sheriff of Somerset and during this time he probably resided at Hache Court. The Duke was executed in 1552 for felony on the order of his nephew King Edward VI, and was attainted by Parliament shortly thereafter when all his titles were forfeited.

==== Edward Seymour, 1st Earl of Hertford (1539–1621) ====
Edward Seymour, 1st Earl of Hertford (1539–1621), eldest surviving son by his father's second marriage, the children from the first marriage having been dis-inherited due to suspected adultery by their mother. He did not inherit his father's titles which had become forfeit, but was elevated to the peerage in 1559 by Queen Elizabeth I (King Edward VI's half-sister) as Baron Beauchamp and Earl of Hertford. His eldest brother, Edward Seymour (1537–1539), who predeceased their father as a two-year-old infant, had been known by the courtesy title "Viscount Beauchamp of Hache", one of his father's subsidiary titles. He married three times: firstly in November 1560 to Lady Catherine Grey, younger sister of Lady Jane Grey, "The Nine Day Queen", by whom he had two sons; secondly in 1582 to Frances Howard; thirdly in 1601 to Frances Prannell.

  - Edward Seymour, Viscount Beauchamp (1561–1612), eldest son and heir apparent by his father's first wife Lady Catherine Grey. He predeceased his father so never inherited his titles, and was known by the courtesy title Viscount Beauchamp, a subsidiary title of his father's. Under the will of King Henry VIII, he had a strong claim to the English throne through his mother, but in 1603 on the death of Queen Elizabeth I the will was disregarded by Parliament and the throne went to the Scottish King James VI of the Stuart dynasty, which line of descent was not favoured by Henry VIII's will.

==== William Seymour, 2nd Duke of Somerset (1588–1660) ====
William Seymour, 2nd Duke of Somerset, 2nd Earl of Hertford, 1st Marquess of Hertford (1588–1660), who succeeded his grandfather Edward Seymour, 1st Earl of Hertford (1539–1621) and in 1641 was created Marquess of Hertford by King Charles I. Eventually on the Restoration of the Monarchy he regained, in 1660 at the behest of King Charles II, the Dukedom which had been granted in 1547 to his great-grandfather Edward Seymour, 1st Duke of Somerset (c. 1500 – 1552). In about 1633 the manor house was visited by the Somerset historian Thomas Gerard (d.1634), who wrote as follows:

The mansion house in which theis noblemen lived which I went to see is soe ruined that were it not called Hach Court you would not believe yt it were any of the remaynes of a Baron's house, yet I sawe in the Hall Beauchampe's armes and in a little Chappell on the top of the house Seymer's winges "or" in a red shield, and going a little farther to the Church to see some monuments I find not one, the Church having bin new built long since the Beauchamps time; only in a large North Ile I saw the Armes of Seymour, Beauchampe, Stermy and Coker quartered, which shewes that it must be noe older then Henry the seaventh his time, when peace upon the union of the houses of Lancaster and Yorke produced plentie, and that pious workes, for that Sir John Seymer which married Coker's heire did die the nineteenth of Edward the fourth and his wife seaven yeares before him wherefore it must be his sonne that built it, otherwise he could not have quartered Coker's Armes

==== William Seymour, 3rd Duke of Somerset (1654–1671) ====
William Seymour, 3rd Duke of Somerset (1654–1671), grandson, son of Henry Seymour, Lord Beauchamp (1626–1654), 3rd but eldest surviving son of the 2nd Duke, who predeceased his father having married Mary Capell. He died unmarried and without progeny and was succeeded in the Dukedom by his uncle, but his estates, which were not entailed with the dukedom, were inherited by his sister Lady Elizabeth Seymour, wife of Thomas Bruce, 3rd Earl of Elgin and 2nd Earl of Ailesbury.

=== Bruce ===
Arms of Bruce, Earl of Elgin: Or, a saltire and chief gules on a canton argent a lion rampant azure armed and langued of the second

Lady Elizabeth Seymour (c. 1655 – 1697), heiress of Hatch and other Seymour estates including Savernake Forest, Wiltshire. She also became representative as senior co-heir of Princess Mary Tudor (1496–1533), sister of King Henry VIII, through the families of Grey and Brandon. In 1676 she married Thomas Bruce, 3rd Earl of Elgin and 2nd Earl of Ailesbury (1656–1741). Thus the lands of Hatch passed to the Bruce family but were not long retained.

=== Uttermare ===
- John Uttermare (died 1750) of Hatch Green, a member of an old Somerset family, purchased the lordship of the manor of Hatch Beauchamp in 1722. He and his descendants lived in the house now called "Lodge".
- James Uttermare (died 1800)
- John Uttermare (died 1841). A mural monument survives in Hatch Beauchamp Church to members of the Uttermare family. His eventual heir was Mr. R. J. Liston Foulis, who in 1905 sold the lordship of Hatch Beauchamp with Hatch Green Farm and its 174 acres of land to Mr. F. J. Rails.

=== Collins ===
The descent in the Collins family of the estate of Hatch Beauchamp, but apparently not the lordship of the manor (held by the heirs of the Uttermares), was as follows:

- John Collins (1725–1792) was the son of John I Collins (died 1738) of Ilminster, from a family of wool and cloth merchants. He matriculated at New College, Oxford in 1743–44, aged 19. In 1755 he built Hatch Court, which survives today, to the designs of Thomas Prowse, MP, of Axbridge. He was Sheriff of Somerset in 1757. In 1769 he married Jane Langford, one of the daughters and co-heiresses of Jonas Langford of Theobalds Park, Hertfordshire and of the Island of Antigua. She brought considerable wealth to the marriage, presumably from the West Indian sugar trade. He died in 1792 aged 67 and was buried at Ilminster. He left five children, all minors.
- John Raw Collins (died 1807), eldest son and heir.
- Henry Powell Collins (1776–1854), younger brother, twice MP for Taunton (1811–1818, 1819–1820) resided at Hatch Court from 1809 to 1821. He was a churchwarden of Hatch Beauchamp Church from 1814 to 1819 and again in 1821. He was Sheriff of Somerset in 1827. He married Dorothea Lethbridge, daughter of Sir John Lethbridge, 1st Baronet (1746–1815), MP, of Sandhill Park in Bishops Lydeard, Somerset. He declined to stand for election a third time in 1820 due to his wife's ill health, and in an open letter to the electors of Taunton dated 8 February 1820 he stated his intention of taking his wife abroad to a warmer climate. In 1822 Thomas Clifton Esq. is recorded as residing there. Henry Powell Collins built a private pew in Hatch Beauchamp Church, for which he received a faculty dated 6 July 1825, in which he was described as the "owner and occupier of a newly erected messuage or mansion in the parish of Hatch Beauchamp." This mansion was Hatch Park, which was bequeathed to him by his father, and on which he built a new house. He died in 1854 and was buried at Ilminster. His only child and sole-heiress apparent was his daughter Dorothea Jacintha Collins (died 1822), who predeceased her father, having married and had a son by William Gore Langton, son and heir of William Gore Langton of Newton Park near Bath in Somerset. She died on 26 June 1822 at the Pulteney Hotel in London; her body was brought to Ilminster for burial.

=== Gore-Langton ===
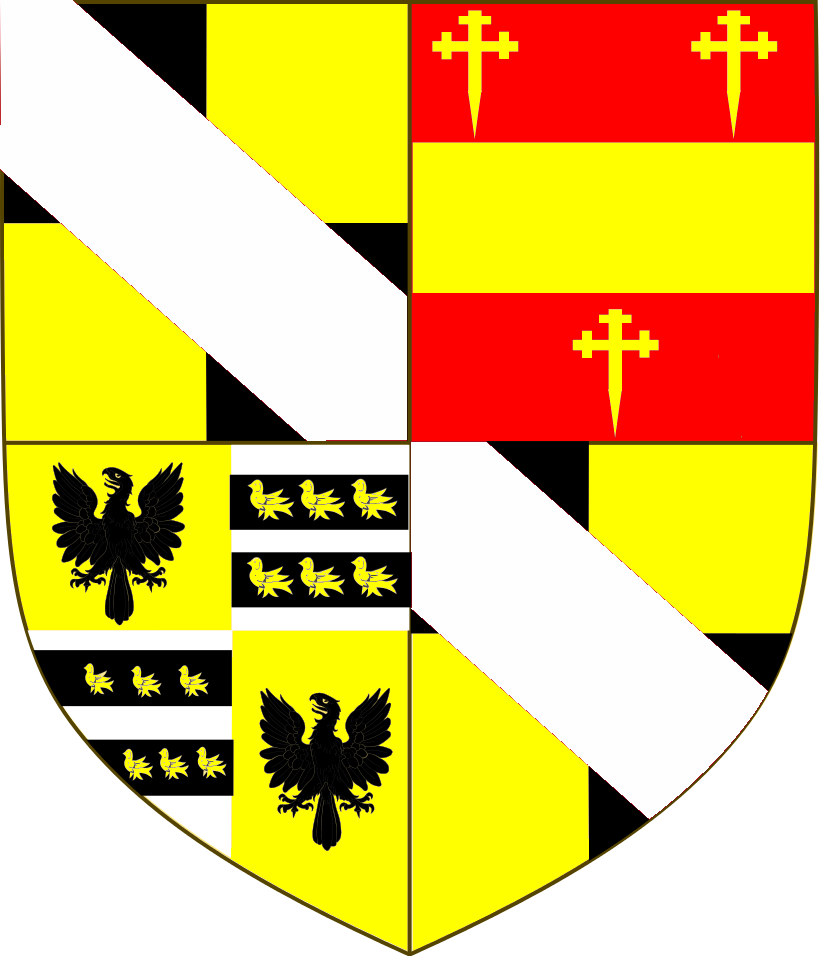
Arms of Temple-Gore-Langton, Earl Temple of Stowe: Quarterly: 1st & 4th grand quarters: Quarterly sable and or a bend argent (Langton); 2nd grand quarter; Gules, a fesse between three cross-crosslets fitchée or (Gore); 3rd grand quarter: quarterly 1st & 4th: Or, an eagle displayed sable (Temple); 2nd & 3rd: Argent, two bars sable each charged with three martlets or (Temple)

- William Henry Powell Gore Langton (1824–1873), twiceMP for West Somerset (1851–59 and 1863–73), in 1854 succeeded his maternal grandfather Henry Powell Collins to Hatch Court and to the family pew. He had also been the heir in 1847 to the Somerset estates of his grandfather William Gore Langton (c. 1760 – 1847), MP, of Newton Park, near Bath in Somerset and of Dean House, Oxfordshire and 12 Grosvenor Square, Mayfair. He was a churchwarden from 1855 to 1869 and in 1867 was largely responsible for employing George Gilbert Scott to restore the church. In 1846 he married Lady Anna Eliza Mary Temple-Grenville (died 1879), daughter of Richard Temple-Grenville, 2nd Duke of Buckingham and Chandos, by whom he had several children. His wife was in special remainder to the Earldom of Temple of Stowe created for her grandfather Richard Temple-Grenville, 1st Duke of Buckingham and Chandos. Memorial windows survive to W. H. P. Gore Langton and to Lady Anna Eliza Mary in the family pew in Hatch Beauchamp Church. His eldest son was William Temple-Gore-Langton, 4th Earl Temple of Stowe, who succeeded as the 4th Earl in 1889. His younger son Henry Powell Gore Langton inherited Hatch Court.
- Henry Powell Gore Langton, younger son, heir to Hatch Court.
- Commander Hubert Edwin Gore Langton (died 1968), son. He married his cousin, Lady Alice Mary Temple-Gore-Langton, daughter of Earl Temple of Stowe. He served in both world wars. In World War I he commanded destroyers on the Dover Patrol and took part in Battle of Zeebrugge, for which he won the D.S.O. and the Croix de Guerre. In memory of his wife in 1964 he presented a piece of land to the village to be called the "Lady Alice Gore Langton Memorial Field". Early in World War II several evacuee children from London were billeted in Hatch Park. During the night of 3 February 1940 the house caught fire and Miss Sarah Tennant, the Gore Langton family nurse and at the time the housekeeper, died whilst searching a burning room to make sure that all the children were safe. Her funeral in Hatch Beauchamp church on 8 February was attended by a great concourse of friends and villagers in tribute to her act of self-sacrifice and devotion. The old house was totally destroyed and now a new and smaller house stands on its site.

=== Oakes ===
During the early 19th century Hatch Court had many different occupiers. From 1838 to 1855 William Oakes owned it He was a churchwarden and there is a memorial to him in the west porch.

=== Hardstaff ===
From 1856 to the end of the century various members of the Hardstaff family resided at Hatch Court. They were Methodists, and Henry Hardstaff built a small Methodist chapel on the edge of the park. However, the Hardstaff family as owners of Hatch Court retained the right to the use of five pews in the north aisle of the church, and this is Shawn on the Gilbert Scott plan of the church (1867).

=== Lloyd ===
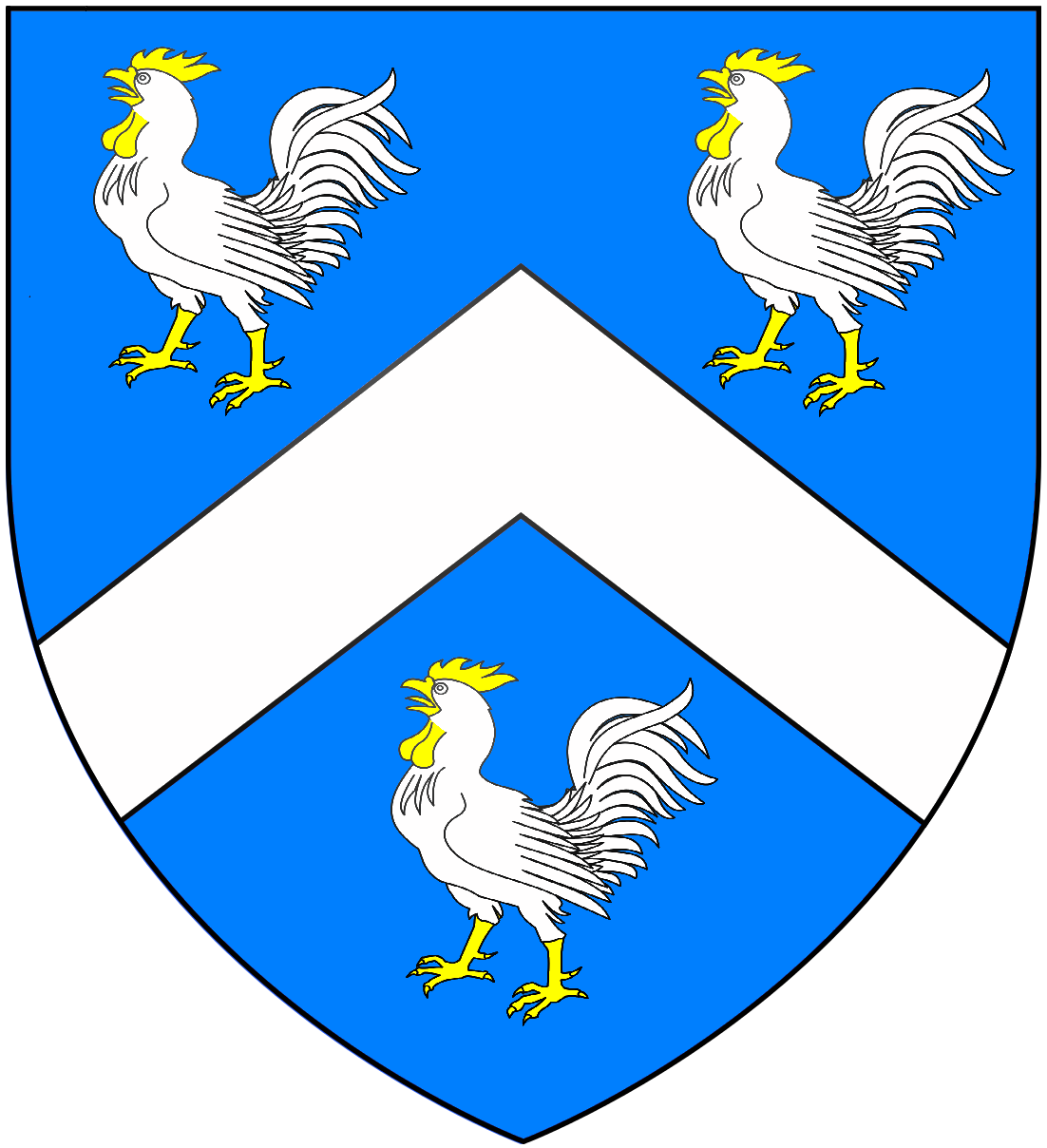
Arms of Lloyd of Dolobran, Montgomery, Wales (of which family were the Lloyd Quakers, bankers and steel manufacturers of Birmingham: Azure, a chevron between three cocks argent armed crested and wattled or

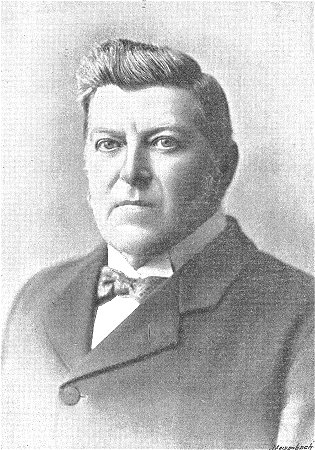
(William) Henry Lloyd (1839–1916), who in 1899 purchased Hatch Court

In 1899 (William) Henry Lloyd (1839–1916) purchased Hatch Court and its 360-acre estate. He was a member of the wealthy Lloyd family of Birmingham, Quakers by religion, long established steel manufacturers and founders of Lloyds Bank, which originated at Dolobran Hall, Montgomeryshire in Wales. He was the fifth son of Samuel II "Quaker" Lloyd (1795–1862), who established the iron founder "Lloyds Foster & Co." which owned the "Old Park Works" foundry and colliery in Wednesbury. The firm however lost a fortune supplying materials for Blackfriars Bridge in London. In 1818 "Quaker" Lloyd moved residence to The Hollies, Wood Green, Wednesbury to supervise his mining estate. He took over Bills & Mills ironworks and renamed it "Darlastan Iron Company" and built Kings Hill Ironworks. "Quaker" Lloyd married Mary Honeychurch (1795–1865). "Quaker" Lloyd's father was Samuel I Lloyd (1768–1849), banker, the second son of Sampson III Lloyd (1728–1807) who with his own father Sampson II Lloyd (1699–1779) of Farm, Bordesley, Birmingham, had co-founded Lloyds Bank in 1765. Sampson II Lloyd was an ironmaster from Dolobran in Montgomeryshire and lived at Farm, Bordesley (now the historic building known as "Lloyd's Farmhouse", Farm Park, Sampson Road, Sparkbrook). Together with his brother Charles Lloyd, Sampson II Lloyd bought the Town Mill iron-forge in Burton-upon-Trent and traded in iron.

In 1874 (William) Henry Lloyd, later of Hatch Beauchamp, toured the United States and Canada, researching the latest industrial developments and making contacts with fellow Quakers. He served as Mayor of Wednesbury (1892–94), when he was living in Hall Green, Birmingham. He married (Margaret) Percie Chirnside (1861–1933), twenty years his junior, a daughter of Jack Chirnside (1833–1902), born in Northumberland, a pioneering sheep farmer and wool producer in Australia, whose uncles Thomas Chirnside and Andrew Chirnside (owner of Skibo Castle in Scotland) founded the "Chirnside Pastoral Empire" and built the Italianate style mansion Werribee Park in Victoria. in Victoria, Australia. Henry Lloyd left Birmingham in 1899 and lived in Hatch Court until his death in 1917, having renovated the house and improved the woods and deer-park. He converted the Methodist chapel as a reading room for the village boys, now used as the parish council meeting room. As he was a Quaker, his wife performed on his behalf the manorial role of patron of Hatch Beauchamp church. His widow remarried to Rev. Herbert Stanley Gallimore, Rector of Hatch Beauchamp Church and twenty years her junior, who out of modesty for his clerical position preferred not to live in the grand manor house, and the couple moved into Laburnum Cottage on the estate.

=== Gault ===
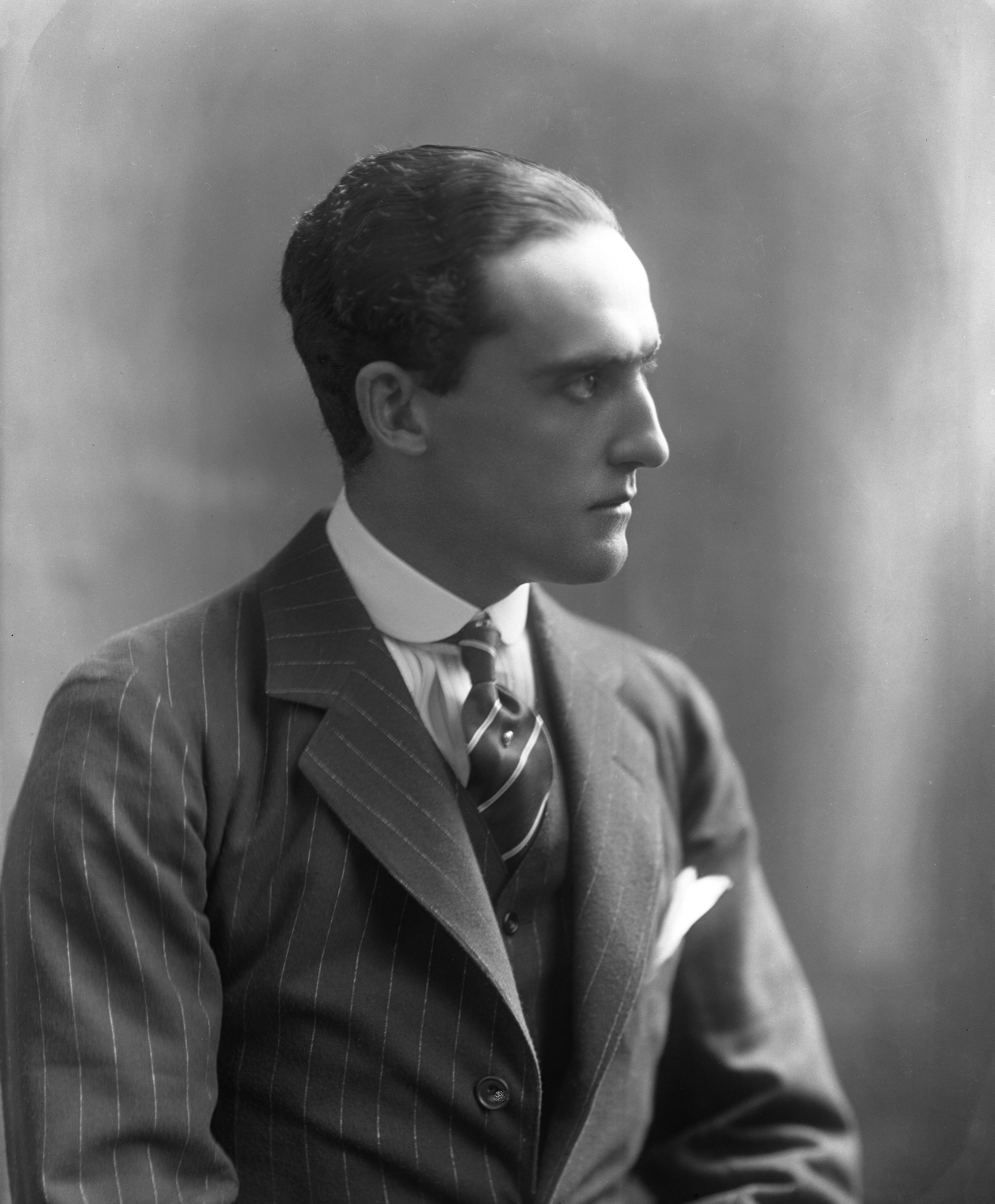
Brigadier Andrew Hamilton Gault (1882–1958)

From 1923 Brigadier Andrew Hamilton Gault (1882–1958) and his second wife Dorothy Blanche Shuckburgh (1898–1972) (granddaughter of R.H. Shuckburgh, JP, of Bourton Hall, Warwickshire), became tenants of Hatch Court, rented from Dorothy's aunt Mrs (Margaret) Percie Gallimore (née Chirnside and widow of (William) Henry Lloyd of Hatch Beauchamp), and in 1931 Brigadier Gault bought the property and gave it to his wife. He was the eldest son of Andrew Frederick Gault (1833–1903) of Montreal in Canada, "The Cotton King of Canada", a merchant, industrialist, and philanthropist born in Strabane, Northern Ireland, the youngest son of Leslie Gault, a merchant and shipowner, by his wife Mary Hamilton. His brother was Mathew Hamilton Gault (1822–1887) who founded the "Sun Insurance Company of Montreal", now Sun Life Financial Incorporated, one of the largest life insurance companies in the world. He served as Conservative and Unionist MP for Taunton from 1922 to 1935. He was a churchwarden and He gave the Hamilton Gault and Galmington playing fields to the Borough of Taunton, and for these benefactions he was made a Freeman of the Borough. He returned to Canada after World War II for tax reasons, where he died in 1958, having occupied for only three weeks his newly built mansion house on his estate at Mont Saint-Hilaire, which he bequeathed to his alma mater McGill University. A Bronze Memorial was placed in the floor of the south aisle of Hatch Beauchamp Church by his widow. Part of the inscription reads: '1882–1958. Brigadier A. Hamilton Gault, D.S.O., E.D., C.N., of Hatch Court and Mount St. Hilaire, Canada. Founder of Princess Patricia's Canadian Light Infantry. Freeman of the Borough of Taunton." Brigadier Gault came with this famous regiment to France in 1914 and took command of it in 1915. He was the last private citizen of the British Empire to raise and equip a regiment. Following his death his widow returned to Hatch Court in 1959, and to keep her company invited her niece Mrs Anne Blanche Townson (1922–1995) and her family to live with her. Anne was the eldest daughter of Lily Ellen Margaret ("Pearl") Shuckburgh (1894–1981) by her husband (Walter) Cecil Collett Sykes (died 1945), of Horsham in Sussex, of the Royal Flying Corps. She was the wife of John ("Jack") Strover Townson, Royal Navy.

=== Odgers ===
Mrs Anne Townson's first husband died in 1967 and she remarried in 1971 to Barry Nation, a retired officer in the Fleet Air Arm. In 1984, 11 years before her death, she handed over Hatch Court to her daughter Mrs Jane Margaret Odgers (born 1951), who as a child had lived at Hatch Court with her family to provide company for her widowed great-aunt Mrs Dorothy Gault, and recalled that "My great aunt loved having us children around ... every Saturday morning we used to have breakfast in her bed, brought up by her Italian butler". Jane is the wife of Dr Robin Odgers, a GP who became the local doctor after the couple with their two daughters, Susannah and Emma-Jane, moved there from London in 1983. Dr Odgers renovated the one-and-a-half acre walled kitchen garden, from which he supplied the restaurant of the Castle Hotel in nearby Taunton. In 2000, anticipating the departure of their daughters to boarding school and having concluded that the house was too large for their needs, they sold Hatch Court for an asking price of £3 million, including 33 acres and three cottages, and moved to Corton Denham House, near Sherborne in Dorset.

Jane's brother John Townson (born 1949) still lives at Belmont Farm, the former home farm of the Hatch estate which he took over with 200 acres in 1978.

== Sources ==
- Sanders, I.J. English Baronies: A Study of their Origin and Descent 1086–1327, Oxford, 1960, p. 51, Hatch Beauchamp, Somerset
- Batten, John, The Barony of Beauchamp of Somerset, published in Proceedings of the Somerset Archaeological and Natural History Society, Vol.36.
- Cookson, Christopher, Hatch Beauchamp Church, section: Historical Note on the Church and its Associations, 1972
- Townson, John, John Bell Chirnside (1833–1902): His Life, Family and Descendants, 2009 . The author lives at Belmont Farm, Hatch Beauchamp, and is the son of Anne Blanche Townson (née Sykes) (1922–1995), owner Hatch Court.
- Collinson, John, History and Antiquities of the County of Somerset, Volume 1, Bath, 1791, pp. 43–6, Hatch-Beauchamp
- Wilhelmina, Duchess of Cleveland The Battle Abbey Roll with some Account of the Norman Lineages, 3 volumes, London, 1889, vol.1, Sent More
