= House of Seymour =

English noble family of Welsh origin

Seymour
- Coat of arms of the Seymour Dukes of Somerset
- Country: Kingdom of England; United Kingdom
- Founded: 11th century
- Founder: Wido de St Maur
- Current head: John Seymour, 19th Duke of Somerset
- Titles: Queen consort of England; Duke of Somerset; Baron Seymour; Hertford branch: Marquess of Hertford; Earl of Yarmouth

The House of Seymour or St. Maur, is an old English family in which several titles of nobility have from time to time been created, and of which the Duke of Somerset is the head. They reached the peak of their influence during the Tudor period, when Jane Seymour became the third wife and queen consort of Henry VIII, their son being the future King Edward VI of England.

== Origins ==
The family was settled in Monmouthshire in the 13th century. The original form of the name "Seymour", which was resumed by the dukes of Somerset from early in the 19th century to 1923, seems to have been St. Maur, of which William Camden says that Seymour was a later corruption. It appears that about the year 1240 Gilbert Marshal, Earl of Pembroke, assisted William St. Maur to wrest a place called Woundy (now Undy), near Caldicot in Monmouthshire, from the Welsh. Woundy and Penhow, at the latter of which he made his residence, were the property of Sir Richard St. Maur at the end of the 13th century, but they were lost by the family through the marriage of Sir Richard's great-great-granddaughter, the only child of John St. Maur, who died in 1359. John St. Maur's younger brother Roger married Cecily de Beauchamp (d. 1393), one of the daughters and eventual co-heiresses of John III de Beauchamp, 2nd Baron Beauchamp (1306-1343), feudal baron of Hatch Beauchamp in Somerset, who brought to her husband the greater part of her father's extensive estates in Somerset, Devon, Buckinghamshire, and Suffolk. The eldest son of this marriage was Sir William St. Maur (d. 1390), or Seymour (the modernised form of the name appears to have come into use about this date), who was an attendant on the Black Prince, and who died in his mother's lifetime, leaving a son Roger St Maur (c. 1366-1420), who inherited his grandmother's estates and added to them by his marriage with Maud Esturmy, daughter of Sir William Esturmy (died 1427) of Wolf Hall, Wiltshire.

According to Agnes Strickland:

Sir John Seymour, of Wolf-hall, Wiltshire, and Margaret Wentworth, daughter of Sir John Wentworth, of Nettlestead, in Suffolk. The Seymours were a family of country gentry who, like most holders of manorial rights, traced their ancestry to a Norman origin. One or two had been knighted in the wars of France, but their names had never emerged from the herald's visitation-rolls into historical celebrity. They increased their boundaries by fortunate alliances with heiresses, and the head of the family married into a collateral branch of the lordly line of Beauchamp. After that event, two instances are quoted of Seymours serving as high sheriff of Wilts. Through Margaret Wentworth, the mother of Jane Seymour, a descent from the blood-royal of England was claimed from an intermarriage with a Wentworth and a supposed daughter of Hotspur and lady Elizabeth Mortimer, grand-daughter to Lionel duke of Clarence. Few persons dared dispute a pedigree with Henry VIII., and Cranmer granted a dispensation for nearness of kin between Henry VIII. and Jane Seymour – rather a work of supererogation, since the parties could not be related within the forbidden degree. Although the royal kindred appears somewhat doubtful, yet it is undeniable that the sovereign of England gained by this alliance one brother in-law who bore the name of Smith, and another whose grandfather was a blacksmith at Putney.

== Sir John Seymour ==
During the next three or four generations the wealth and importance of the Seymours in the western counties increased until, in the reigns of Henry VII and Henry VIII, Sir John Seymour of Wolf Hall became a personage of note in public affairs. He took an active part in suppressing the Cornish Rebellion of 1497; and afterwards attended Henry at the Field of the Cloth of Gold, and on the occasion of the emperor Charles V's visit to England in 1522. The eldest of his ten children was Edward Seymour, 1st Duke of Somerset, the famous Protector in the reign of Edward VI; his third son was Thomas Seymour, Baron Seymour of Sudeley; and his eldest daughter Jane was third wife of King Henry VIII, and mother of Edward VI. The Protector was married twice; and, probably owing to the adultery of his first wife whom he repudiated about 1535, his titles and estates were entailed first on the issue of his second marriage with Anne, daughter of Sir Edward Stanhope.

The Protector's eldest surviving son by his first marriage, Sir Edward Seymour (died 1593), knight, of Berry Pomeroy, Devon, was father of Sir Edward Seymour (died 1613) who was created a baronet in 1611; and the baronetcy then descended for six generations from father to son, all of whom were named Edward, until, in 1750, on the failure of heirs of the Protector by his second marriage, Sir Edward Seymour, 6th baronet of Berry Pomeroy, succeeded to the dukedom of Somerset. The 3rd baronet, in whose time the family seat at Berry Pomeroy was plundered and burnt by the Roundheads, had a younger brother Henry (1612–1686), who was a close personal attendant of Prince Charles during the Civil War, and bore the prince's last message to his father, Charles I, before the latter's execution. Henry Seymour continued his service to Charles II in exile, and at the Restoration he received several valuable offices from the king. In 1669 he bought the estate of Langley in Buckinghamshire, where he lived till his death in 1686. In 1681, his son Henry, at the age of seven years, was created a baronet.

=== Family tree ===
Henry VII of England
John Seymour	Mary Tudor, Queen of France	Margaret Tudor, Queen of Scotland
Catherine Parr	Henry VIII of England	Jane Seymour	Thomas Seymour, 1st Baron Seymour of Sudeley	Edward Seymour, 1st Duke of Somerset	Frances Grey, Duchess of Suffolk
Edward VI of England	Edward Seymour, 1st Earl of Hertford	Lady Catherine Grey	Lady Jane Grey
Dukes of Somerset	Many Generations	Many Generations
Elizabeth, Queen of the United Kingdom	George VI of the United Kingdom
Elizabeth II of the United Kingdom

== Sir Edward Seymour, 4th Baronet ==
Sir Edward Seymour, 4th Baronet (1633–1708), speaker of the House of Commons, was elected member of parliament for Gloucester in 1661, and his influence at Court together with his natural abilities procured for him a position of weight in the House of Commons. He was appointed to the lucrative post of treasurer of the navy; and in 1667 he moved the impeachment of Lord Clarendon, which he carried to the House of Lords. In 1672 he was elected speaker, an office which he filled with distinction until 1679, when, having been unanimously re-elected to the chair, the king refused to confirm the choice of the Commons. On the accession of James II, Seymour courageously opposed the arbitrary measures of the Crown; and at the revolution he adhered to the Prince of Orange. In 1691 he became a lord of the treasury, but losing his place three years Later he took an active part in the Tory opposition to William's Whig ministers; and in later years he was not less hostile to those of Queen Anne, but owing to the ascendancy of Marlborough he lost all influence for some time before his death, which took place in 1708. Seymour was not less arrogant than his relative the proud Duke of Somerset; but he was described by Burnet as the ablest man of his party, the first speaker of the House of Commons that was not bred to the law; a graceful man, bold and quick, and of high birth. Sir Edward Seymour was twice married. By his first wife he had two sons, Edward, 5th baronet, whose son Edward became the 8th duke of Somerset, and William, who became a lieutenant-general; by his second wife, a daughter of Alexander Popham of Littlecote House, he had six sons, the eldest of whom, Popham, on succeeding to the estates of his mother's cousin, Edward, Earl of Conway, assumed the name of Conway in addition to that of Seymour. Popham was killed in a duel with Colonel Kirk in 1669, and his estates devolved on his next brother, Francis, who likewise assumed the name of Conway, and having been created Baron Conway in 1703 was the father of Francis Seymour Conway (1719–1794), created Marquess of Hertford in 1793, and of field-marshal Henry Seymour Conway.

== Edward Seymour, 1st Earl of Hertford ==
The eldest son of the Protector's second marriage, Edward Seymour (1537–1621), was relieved by act of parliament in the reign of Queen Mary from the attainder passed on his father in 1551, and was created Baron Beauchamp and earl of Hertford in 1559. In 1560 he secretly married Lady Catherine Grey, second daughter of Henry Grey, 1st Duke of Suffolk, and sister of Lady Jane Grey, claimant of the crown as great-granddaughter of Henry VII, on whose death Catherine stood next in succession to the throne after Queen Elizabeth under the will of Henry VIII. On this account both parties to the marriage incurred the displeasure of Queen Elizabeth; they were imprisoned in the Tower of London, and the fact of their marriage, together with the legitimacy of their two sons, was denied. The eldest of these sons was Edward Seymour (1561–1612), styled Lord Beauchamp notwithstanding the question as to his legitimacy, who in 1608 obtained a patent declaring that, after his father's death he should become earl of Hertford. He, however, died before his father, leaving three sons, one of whom, William, became 2nd duke of Somerset; and another, Francis, was created Baron Seymour of Trowbridge in 1641. The latter had at first taken an active part in the opposition in the House of Commons to the government of Charles I, having been elected member for Wiltshire in 1620. He represented the same constituency in both the Short and the Long Parliaments; and he refused to pay ship money in 1639. When, however, the popular party proceeded to more extreme measures, Francis Seymour refused his support, and was rewarded by being raised to the peerage; he voted in the House of Lords against the attainder of Strafford, and in 1642 he joined Charles at York and fought on the royalist side throughout the Great Rebellion. He died in 1664. His grandson Francis, 3rd baron, succeeded to the dukedom of Somerset in 1675; and on the death of his nephew Algernon, 7th duke of Somerset, in 1750, the male line of the Protector by his second marriage became extinct, and the dukedom reverted to the elder line, the 6th baronet of Berry Pomeroy becoming 8th duke of Somerset.

== Henry Seymour ==
Henry Seymour (1729–1805), a son of the 8th duke of Somerset's brother Francis, was elected to the House of Commons in 1763; in 1778 he went to France, and fixing his residence at Prunay, near Versailles, he became the lover of Madame du Barry, many of whose letters to him are preserved in Paris. He was twice married, and in addition to children by both wives he left an illegitimate daughter, Henriette Felicity, who married Sir James Doughty-Tichborne, by whom she was the mother of Roger Tichborne, impersonated in 1871 by the famous impostor Arthur Orton.

== Lord Hugh Seymour ==
Lord Hugh Seymour (1759–1801), a younger son of Francis Seymour-Conway, marquess of Hertford, was a distinguished naval officer who saw much active service especially under Lord Howe, in whose famous action on 1 June 1794 he took a conspicuous part. His son Sir George Francis Seymour (1787–1870), admiral of the fleet, began his naval career by serving under Nelson; in 1818 he became Sergeant-at-arms in the House of Lords, a post which he retained till 1841, when he was promoted to the rank of rear-admiral and appointed a lord of the admiralty; his eldest son, Francis George Hugh Seymour (1812–1884), succeeded his cousin Richard Seymour-Conway as 5th marquess of Hertford in 1870. Lord Hugh Seymour's younger son, Sir Horace Seymour, was the father of Frederick Beauchamp Paget Seymour, Baron Alcester.

== Sir Michael Seymour ==
A younger branch of the great house of Seymour is said to have settled in Ireland in the reign of Elizabeth, from which Sir Michael Seymour, 1st Baronet (1768–1834) claimed descent. Sir Michael, like so many of his name, was an officer in the navy, in which he rendered much distinguished service in the last decade of the 18th century. He lost an arm in Howe's action on 1 June 1794; and between 1796 and 1810 as commander of the Spitfire, and afterwards of the Amethyst, he captured a great number of prizes from the French in the English Channel. In 1809 he was created a baronet (see Culme-Seymour baronets). Seymour became a rear-admiral in 1832, and died two years later while in chief command on the South American station. His son, Sir Michael Seymour (1802–1887), entered the navy in 1813, and attained the rank of rear-admiral in 1854, in which year he served under Sir Charles Napier in the Baltic Sea during the war with Russia. In 1856 he was in command of the China station, and conducted the operations arising out of the affair of the lorcha Arrow; he destroyed the Qing Chinese fleet in June 1857, took Canton in December, and in 1858 he captured the forts on the Pei Ho (Hai River), compelling the Chinese government to consent to the Treaty of Tientsin. In 1864 he was promoted to the rank of admiral. Admiral Sir Edward Hobart Seymour was the nephew of Sir Michael Seymour (1802–1887).

== Notable members ==
- Sir John Seymour (died 1464) MP
  - John Seymour (c. 1425–1463) MP
    - John Seymour (died 1491)
      - Sir John Seymour (c. 1474–1536)
        - Edward Seymour, 1st Duke of Somerset (c. 1500–1552)
          - Lord Edward Seymour (c. 1528–1593)
            - Sir Edward Seymour, 1st Baronet (c. 1563–1613) MP
              - Sir Edward Seymour, 2nd Baronet (c. 1580–1659) MP
                - Sir Edward Seymour, 3rd Baronet (1610–1688) MP
                  - Sir Edward Seymour, 4th Baronet (c. 1632–1708) MP
                    - Sir Edward Seymour, 5th Baronet (c. 1663–1741) MP
                      - Edward Seymour, 8th Duke of Somerset (c. 1694–1757) MP
                        - Edward Seymour, 9th Duke of Somerset (1717–1792)
                        - Webb Seymour, 10th Duke of Somerset (1718–1793)
                          - Edward St Maur, 11th Duke of Somerset (1775–1855)
                            - Edward St Maur, 12th Duke of Somerset (1804–1885) MP
                              - Ferdinand St Maur, Earl St Maur (1835–1869)
                                - Ruth St Maur (1867–1953)
                                - Harold St Maur (1869–1927) MP
                            - Archibald St Maur, 13th Duke of Somerset (1810–1891)
                            - Algernon St Maur, 14th Duke of Somerset (1813–1894)
                              - Algernon St Maur, 15th Duke of Somerset (1846–1923)
                          - Lord Webb Seymour (1777–1819)
                        - Lord Francis Seymour (1725–1799)
                          - Francis Compton Seymour (1755–1822)
                            - Francis Edward Seymour (1788–1866)
                              - Francis Payne Seymour (1815–1870)
                                - Edward Seymour, 16th Duke of Somerset (1860–1931)
                                  - Evelyn Seymour, 17th Duke of Somerset (1882–1954)
                                    - Percy Seymour, 18th Duke of Somerset (1910–1984)
                                      - John Seymour, 19th Duke of Somerset (born 1952)
                      - Francis Seymour (1697–1761) MP
                        - Henry Seymour (1729–1807) MP
                          - Henry Seymour (1776–1849) MP
                            - Henry Danby Seymour (1820–1877) MP
                            - Alfred Seymour (1824–1888) MP
                    - William Seymour (1664–1728) MP
                    - Popham Seymour (1675–1699) MP
                    - Francis Seymour (1679–1732) MP
                      - Francis Seymour-Conway, 1st Marquess of Hertford (1718–1794)
                        - Francis Ingram-Seymour-Conway, 2nd Marquess of Hertford (1743–1822) MP
                          - Francis Seymour-Conway, 3rd Marquess of Hertford (1777–1842) MP
                            - Richard Seymour-Conway, 4th Marquess of Hertford (1800–1870) MP
                        - Lord Henry Seymour (1746–1830) MP
                        - Lord Robert Seymour (1748–1831) MP
                        - Lord Hugh Seymour (1759–1801) MP
                          - Sir George Seymour (1787–1870)
                            - Francis Seymour, 5th Marquess of Hertford (1812–1884)
                              - Hugh Seymour, 6th Marquess of Hertford (1843–1912) MP
                                - George Seymour, 7th Marquess of Hertford (1871–1940)
                                - Lord Henry Charles Seymour (1878–1939)
                                  - Lady Margaret Seymour (1918–1975)
                                  - Hugh Seymour, 8th Marquess of Hertford (1930–1997)
                                    - Harry Seymour, 9th Marquess of Hertford (born 1958)
                            - Henry Seymour (1818–1869) MP
                            - Laura Seymour (1833–1912)
                            - Lord William Seymour (1838–1915)
                          - Hugh Henry John Seymour (1790–1821) MP
                            - Hugh Horatio Seymour (1821–1892)
                              - Hugh Francis Seymour (1855–1930)
                                - Sir Horace James Seymour (1885–1978)
                          - Sir Horace Seymour (1791–1851) MP
                            - Beauchamp Seymour, 1st Baron Alcester (1821–1895)
                          - Frederick Seymour (1797–1856)
                            - Charlotte Seymour (1835–1903)
                        - Lord George Seymour (1763–1848) MP
                          - Sir George Hamilton Seymour (1797–1880)
                            - Alfred Seymour (1843–1897)
                      - Henry Seymour Conway (1721–1795) MP
                        - Anne Seymour Conway (1748–1828)
                  - Henry Seymour (c. 1637–1728) MP
                - Henry Seymour (1612–1686) MP
                  - Sir Henry Seymour, 1st Baronet (1674–1714) MP
          - Lady Anne Seymour (1538–1588)
          - Edward Seymour, 1st Earl of Hertford (1539–1621)
            - Edward Seymour, Lord Beauchamp (1561–1612)
              - William Seymour, 2nd Duke of Somerset (1588–1660) MP
                - Lady Frances Seymour (1618–1681)
                - Henry Seymour, Lord Beauchamp (c. 1626–1654)
                  - William Seymour, 3rd Duke of Somerset (1652–1671)
                - John Seymour, 4th Duke of Somerset (before 1646–1675)
              - Francis Seymour, 1st Baron Seymour of Trowbridge (c. 1590–1664) MP
                - Charles Seymour, 2nd Baron Seymour of Trowbridge (c. 1621–1665) MP
                  - Francis Seymour, 5th Duke of Somerset (1658–1678)
                  - Charles Seymour, 6th Duke of Somerset (1662–1748)
                    - Algernon Seymour, 7th Duke of Somerset (1684–1750) MP
                      - Lady Elizabeth Seymour (1716–1776)
          - Lord Henry Seymour
          - Lady Margaret Seymour
          - Lady Jane Seymour (c. 1541–1561)
        - Sir Henry Seymour (c. 1503–1578) MP
        - Thomas Seymour, 1st Baron Seymour of Sudeley (c. 1508–1549)
          - Mary Seymour
        - Jane Seymour (c. 1508–1537)
        - Elizabeth Seymour (c. 1518–1568)
      - Sir George Seymour
      - Robert Seymour (c. 1480–1545) MP

== Descent of the estate ==
=== Esturmy ===
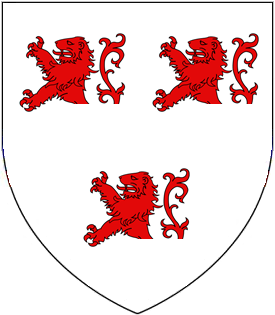
Arms of Esturmy

Wilhelmina, Duchess of Cleveland (1819–1901), in her 1889 work The Battle Abbey Roll with some Account of the Norman Lineages wrote about the Esturmy family, which held the estates of Tottenham, Wulfhall and the Savernake Forest.

Sir William Esturmy (c. 1356 – 1427)) was a Speaker of the House of Commons, a Knight of the Shire and an hereditary Warden of the royal forest of Savernake Forest. He was the son of Geoffrey Sturmy (died 1381) and nephew and heir of Sir Henry Sturmy of Wolfhall. He inherited in 1381 and was knighted by October 1388. He held the post of hereditary warden of Savernake Forest from 1381 to 1417 and from 1420 until his death in 1427. He served as knight of the shire for Hampshire in 1384 and again in 1390, and also eight times for Wiltshire and twice for Devon between then and 1422. He was elected Speaker of the House of Commons in 1404. He was appointed High Sheriff of Wiltshire for 1418. He held a number of public posts and served several times as an ambassador abroad. He married Joan Crawthorne, the widow of Sir John Beaumont of Shirwell and Saunton in North Devon, by whom he had no male progeny, only two daughters and co-heiresses including Maud Esturmy, wife of Roger II Seymour (c.1367/70-1420), feudal barony of Hatch Beauchamp in Somerset, by whom she had a son John Seymour (died 1464). He died at Wolfhall in 1427.

=== Seymour ===
Arms of Seymour

The Seymour family (anciently de St. Maur) is earliest recorded seated at Penhow Castle in Glamorgan in the 12th century. The parish church of Penhow is dedicated to St Maur.

Roger Seymour (c. 1367/70 – 1420), who married Maud Esturmy (alias Esturmi, etc.), a daughter and co-heiress of Sir William Esturmy (died 1427), of Wolfhall in Wiltshire, Speaker of the House of Commons and hereditary Warden of Savernake Forest in Wiltshire. Following his wife's inheritance, he moved his principal seat from Undy to Wolfhall.

His son and heir was Sir John Seymour (c. 1395/1402 – 1464), of Wulfhall in Savernake Forest, and of Hatch Beauchamp. He served as Member of Parliament in 1422 and Knight of the Shire for Wiltshire in 1435, 1439, and 1445 He was also High Sheriff of Wiltshire in 1431–1432.

He was succeeded by John Seymour (died 1491), his grandson and heir; and then Sir John Seymour (1474–1536), the eldest son, knighted in 1497 after the Battle of Deptford Bridge, the father of Queen Jane Seymour (1508–1537).

John's eldest son and heir was Edward Seymour, 1st Duke of Somerset, (c. 1500 – 1552), uncle of King Edward VI and Lord Protector of England. In 1536 he was created Viscount Beauchamp of Hache and in 1537 was created Earl of Hertford. In 1531 he had served as Sheriff of Somerset and during this time he probably resided at Hache Court. Thomas Gerard in his "Description of Somerset" (1633) wrote as follows:

"The mansion house in which theis nobleman lived which I went to see is soe ruined that were it not called Hach Court you would not believe that it were any of the remaynes of a Barons house. yet I sawe in the Hall Beauchampes Armes and in a little Chappell on the top of the house Seymer's, Winges "Or" in a red shield, and going a little further to the church to see some monuments I find not one, the church having bin new built long since the Beauchamps time".

The Duke was executed in 1552 for felony on the order of his nephew King Edward VI, and was attainted by Parliament shortly thereafter when all his titles were forfeited.

It was probably Edward Seymour, 1st Earl of Hertford (1539–1621), son and heir of the 1st Duke, of nearby Wulfhall, who in about 1575 built the first Tottenham House, then known as Totnam Lodge, and enclosed its surrounding land to form a deer park. The Seymours were hereditary Wardens of Savernake Forest, which office together with most of their Wiltshire estates had been inherited by marriage to the daughter and heiress of Sir William Esturmy (died 1427), of Wulfhall. They were also hereditary Wardens of the royal forest of Savernake. The house was still known as the Lodge in 1623, in which year the parish register of Great Bedwyn records the baptism of the 1st Earl's great-granddaughter Frances Seymour, which was performed "at the Lodge in the Great Parke by Henrie Taylor, Vicar of Great Bedwin".

William Seymour, 2nd Duke of Somerset (1587–1660), grandson, inherited the estates on the death of his grandfather the 1st Earl, his father having predeceased the latter. His grandson, William Seymour, 3rd Duke of Somerset (1652–1671) inherited at the age of 8 and died aged 19 when his heir became his uncle John Seymour, 4th Duke of Somerset (1629–1675). However, the heir to his estates in Hampshire, namely Netley Abbey (where the 1st Earl had died) and Hound, was his sister Elizabeth Seymour, wife of Thomas Bruce, 2nd earl of Ailesbury, which were soon sold in 1676 to the Marquess of Worcester.

John Seymour, 4th Duke of Somerset (1629–1675), uncle, inherited the estate in 1671 on the death of the 3rd Duke, and in 1672 he rebuilt Totnam Lodge and redesigned the deer park, which at that date included long tree-lined walks and a deer "chase". He died in 1675, aged 46, only three years after having started the rebuilding. Being childless and faced with the dukedom passing by law to his first cousin once removed and heir male the 5th Duke, who was seated at Marlborough Castle in Wiltshire, he bequeathed the unentailed Seymour estates to his niece Elizabeth Seymour, the wife of Thomas Bruce, 2nd Earl of Ailesbury (1656–1741), and thus the Seymour estates passed to the Bruce family.

=== Bruce ===
Arms of Bruce

Elizabeth Seymour's son and heir was Charles Bruce, 3rd Earl of Ailesbury (died 1747), of Houghton House in the parish of Maulden, in Bedfordshire, who in 1721 rebuilt Totnam Lodge to the design of his brother-in-law the pioneering Palladian architect Lord Burlington. Henry Flitcroft was the executant architect. The 3rd Earl added wings to Burlington's block in the 1730s, and also built in 1743 a Banqueting House in the park to the design of Burlington (demolished in 1824). In 1746, one year before the death of the 3rd Earl, who had no son, it was apparent that on his death the Earldom of Ailesbury would become extinct and his other Earldom of Elgin would pass to a distant cousin and heir male. The former Seymour estates however he was free to dispose of as he pleased. He persuaded the king to create him Baron Bruce of Tottenham, with special remainder to his younger nephew Hon. Thomas Brudenell (1739–1814), 4th son of George Brudenell, 3rd Earl of Cardigan (1685–1732) by his wife Elizabeth Bruce, to whom he also bequeathed his estates with the proviso that he should adopt the additional surname of Bruce, thus having created a new noble family bearing doubly the Bruce name, to continue the custodianship of the Seymour lands.

=== Brudenell ===
Arms of Brudenell

On the 3rd Earl's death in 1747 his 8 year old nephew Thomas Brudenell duly became Thomas Brudenell-Bruce, 2nd Baron Bruce of Tottenham, having inherited the barony, the estates and the Wardenship of Savernake Forest. In 1776 King George III created him Earl of Ailesbury. In 1814 he was succeeded by his son Charles Brudenell-Bruce, 2nd Earl of Ailesbury (1773–1856).

Charles Brudenell-Bruce, 2nd Earl of Ailesbury (1773–1856) in 1818 added stables to the design of Thomas Cundy II. In 1821 he was granted three further titles, Viscount Savernake, Earl Bruce and Marquess of Ailesbury. In 1823–26 he enlarged and re-modelled the house, again to designs of Thomas Cundy.

George Brudenell-Bruce succeeded to his father's titles in 1856. A large church for the estate, St Katherine's, was built 0.6 miles (1 km) north of the house in 1861 by T.H. Wyatt for the marchioness, Mary Caroline (née Herbert).
