= John Seymour (1474–1536) =

English courtier

Sir John Seymour Knight banneret
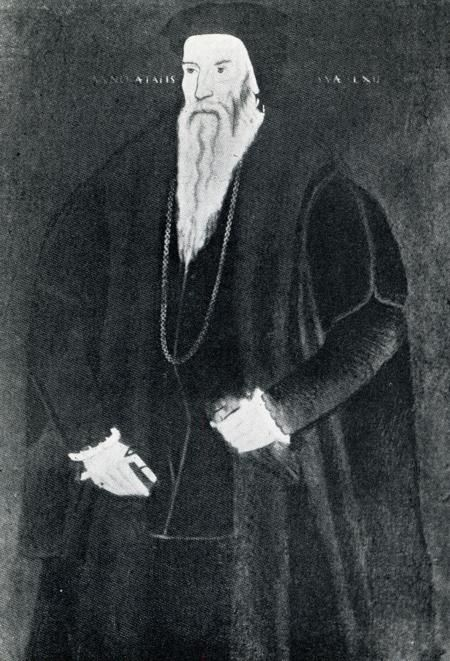
- Born: John Seymour c. 1474
- Died: 21 December 1536 (aged 61–62)
- Resting place: Church of St Mary, Great Bedwyn; 51.3769°N 1.6026°W
- Occupation: courtier
- Known for: Father of Jane Seymour, queen consort of Henry VIII
- Spouse: Margery Wentworth (m. 1494)
- Children: John Seymour; Edward Seymour, 1st Duke of Somerset; Sir Henry Seymour; Thomas Seymour, 1st Baron Seymour of Sudeley; John Seymour; Anthony Seymour; Jane, Queen of England; Margery Seymour; Elizabeth Seymour, Lady Cromwell; Dorothy Seymour
- Parents: John Seymour; Elizabeth Darrell

Sir John Seymour, Knight banneret (c. 1474 – 21 December 1536) was an English soldier and a courtier who served both Henry VII and Henry VIII. Born into a prominent gentry family, he is best known as the father of Henry VIII's third wife, Jane Seymour, and hence the maternal grandfather of king Edward VI of England.

== Family ==
The Seymours were descendants of an Anglo-Norman family that took its name from St. Maur-sur-Loire in Touraine. William de St. Maur in 1240 held the manors of Penhow and Woundy (now called Undy) in Monmouthshire. William's great-grandson, Sir Roger de St. Maur, had two sons: John, whose granddaughter conveyed these manors by marriage into the family of Bowlay of Penhow, who bore the Seymour arms; and Sir Roger (c. 1308 – before 1366), who married Cicely, eldest sister and heir of John de Beauchamp, 3rd Baron Beauchamp. Cicely brought to the Seymours the manor of Hache, Somerset, and her grandson, Roger Seymour, by his marriage with Maud, daughter and heir of Sir William Esturmy, acquired Wulfhall (or Wolf Hall) in the parish of Great Bedwyn in the Savernake Forest, Wiltshire. Sir John Seymour was a great-great-grandson of this Roger Seymour.

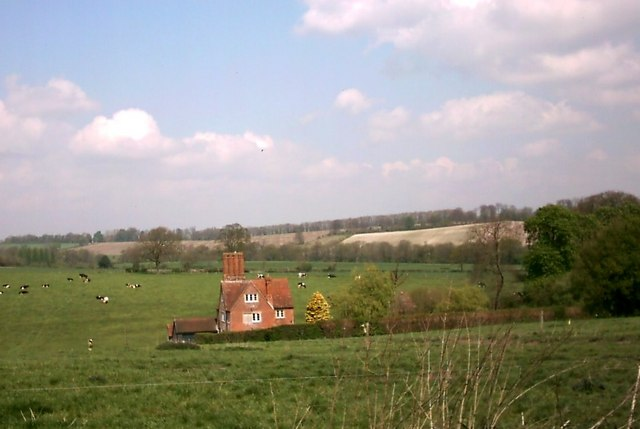
Wolfhall Farm, all that remains of Wulfhall

Sir John Seymour was born around 1474, the eldest son of John Seymour of Wulfhall, by his marriage to Elizabeth Darell (or Darrell). He married Margery, the daughter of Sir Henry Wentworth of Nettlestead, Suffolk, and his wife Anne Say. Anne was the daughter of Sir John Say and his wife, Elizabeth, daughter of Lawrence Cheney (or Cheyne) and Elizabeth Cokayne. Margery Wentworth's grandfather, Sir Philip Wentworth, had married Mary, daughter of John Clifford, 7th Baron de Clifford, whose mother Elizabeth was daughter of Henry Percy (Hotspur) and great-great-granddaughter of Edward III. Margery was renowned for her beauty as well as her quiet and gentle demeanour, and she came to the attention of the poet John Skelton.

== Career ==
Seymour succeeded his father in 1492 and was knighted in the field by Henry VII for his services against the Cornish rebels at Blackheath on 17 June 1497. He was made Knight banneret in 1513. He was present at the sieges of Thérouanne and Tournay in 1513 as well as the two meetings between Henry VIII and Francis I: the Field of the Cloth of Gold in 1520, and again in 1532.

=== Offices held ===
His offices included:

- Warden, Savernake Forest, Wiltshire October 1491
- Sheriff, Wiltshire 1498–1499, 1507–1508, 1518–19, 1524 – January 1526
- Sheriff of Somerset and Dorset 1515–1516, 1526–1527
- Justice of the peace Wiltshire 1499–1536
- Steward, Edward Stafford, 3rd Duke of Buckingham's lands, Wiltshire by 1503
- Knight of the body by 1509
- Constable and door-ward, Bristol Castle, Gloucestershire August 1509, jointly. (with son Edward) July 1517
- Under captain, Dragon of Greenwich 1512
- Commissioner subsidy, Wiltshire 1512, 1514, 1515, Wiltshire and Salisbury 1523
- Commissioner musters, Wiltshire 1513
- Commissioner loan 1524
- Steward, manor of Kingston Lisle, Berkshire before 1513
- Forester, Grovely, Wiltshire February 1526
- Groom of the Bedchamber 1532

== Marriage and issue ==
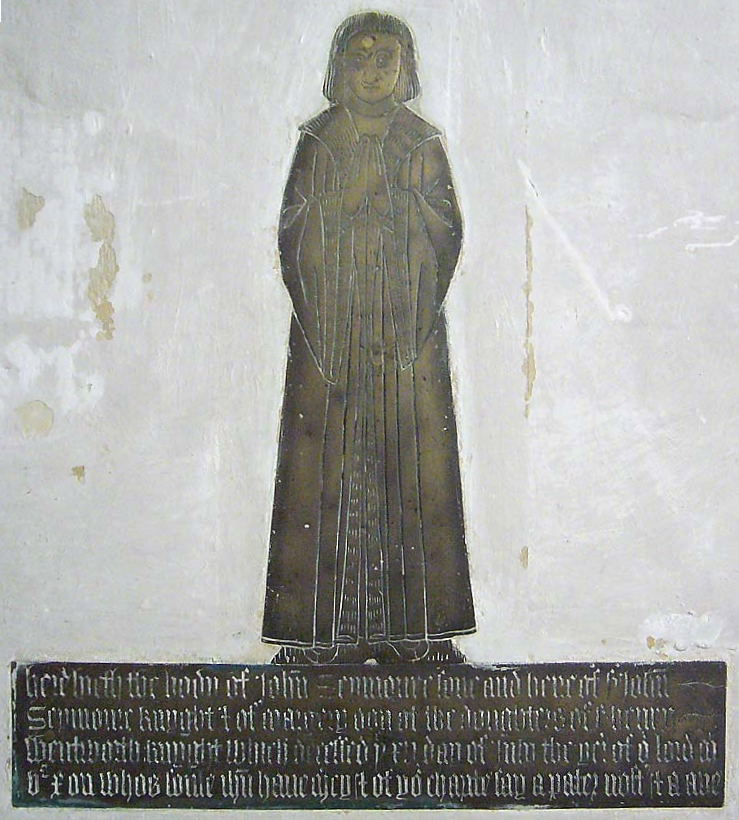
Monumental brass of John Seymour (died 15 July 1510), Seymour's eldest son

Sir John Seymour married Margery Wentworth on 22 October 1494. The couple had ten children:

- John Seymour (died 15 July 1510), eldest son and heir apparent who predeceased his father without progeny. His monumental brass survives set into the floor of Great Bedwyn church, inscribed as follows:

"Here lyeth the body of John Seymour sonne and here of Sr John Seymour, Knight, & of Margery oon of the daughters of Sr Henry Wentworth, Knight, which decessed ye xv day of July the yer of or Lord MV^{C}X on whos soule Jh(es)u have m(er)cy & of yor charitie say a Pater Nost(er) & a Ave (Maria)"

- Edward Seymour, 1st Duke of Somerset, Lord Protector of Edward VI (c. 1500 – 22 January 1552) married firstly Catherine Filliol, daughter of Sir William Filliol and secondly Anne, daughter of Sir Edward Stanhope
- Sir Henry Seymour (1503–1578) married Barbara, daughter of Morgan Wolfe
- Thomas Seymour, 1st Baron Seymour of Sudeley (c. 1508 – 20 March 1549) married Catherine Parr, widow of Henry VIII
- John Seymour (died young)
- Anthony Seymour (died c. 1528)
- Jane Seymour, queen Consort of Henry VIII (c. 1509 – 24 October 1537)
- Elizabeth Seymour, Lady Cromwell (c. 1518 – 19 March 1568) through whom Sir John Seymour is an ancestor of actor Danny Dyer
- Margery Seymour (died c. 1528)
- Dorothy Seymour, Lady Smith (c. 1520–1574) married firstly, Sir Clement Smith (c. 1515 – 26 August 1552), MP, of Little Baddow, Essex and secondly, Thomas Leventhorpe of Shingle Hall, Hertfordshire

Of the ten children born at Wulfhall, six survived – three sons: Edward, Henry and Thomas, and three daughters: Jane, Elizabeth and Dorothy. Edward, Thomas, Jane and Elizabeth were courtiers. Edward and Thomas would both be executed during the reign of Edward VI. Henry Seymour, who lacked his brothers' ambition, lived away from court in relative obscurity.

Seymour also had an illegitimate son:

- Sir John Seymour (c. 1530 – before August 15 1596), married in March 1568 Jane or Joan Poyntz, daughter of Sir Nicholas Poyntz and Joan Berkeley.

=== Notable children ===
Four of the Seymour children achieved prominence at the royal court: Edward, Thomas, Jane and Elizabeth.

Jane Seymour, the eldest surviving daughter, was a maid of honour to Henry's first wife, Catherine of Aragon, and later to Anne Boleyn. Henry VIII stayed at Wulfhall with Queen Anne in the summer of 1535 for a few days. In early 1536, Henry declared his love for Jane and began spending increasing amounts of time with her, chaperoned by her brother, Edward. Henry and Jane were formally betrothed the day after Anne Boleyn was arrested and executed on charges of treason, adultery and incest. After Jane became queen on 30 May 1536, her family scaled the social ranks, as was befitting the family of a royal consort.

Her eldest brother, Edward, was made an earl and eventually a duke and briefly ruled England on behalf of his nephew, King Edward VI. Her second brother, Thomas, was made a baron and Lord High Admiral, and in 1547 eloped with Henry VIII's widow, Queen Catherine Parr. Both Edward and Thomas were beheaded for treason, a few years apart.

Seymour's second daughter, Elizabeth, was first married to Sir Anthony Ughtred (c.1478 – 1534), secondly to Gregory Cromwell (c.1520 – 1551), son of Henry VIII's chief minister, Thomas Cromwell, and for a third time to John Paulet, Baron St John (c.1510 – 1576), who succeeded his father as Marquess of Winchester in 1572.

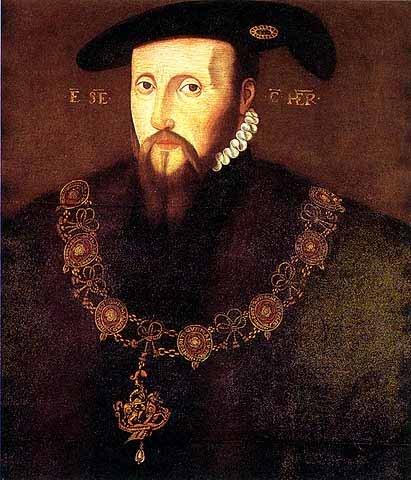
Edward Seymour, 1st Earl of Hertford, later 1st Duke of Somerset and Lord Protector

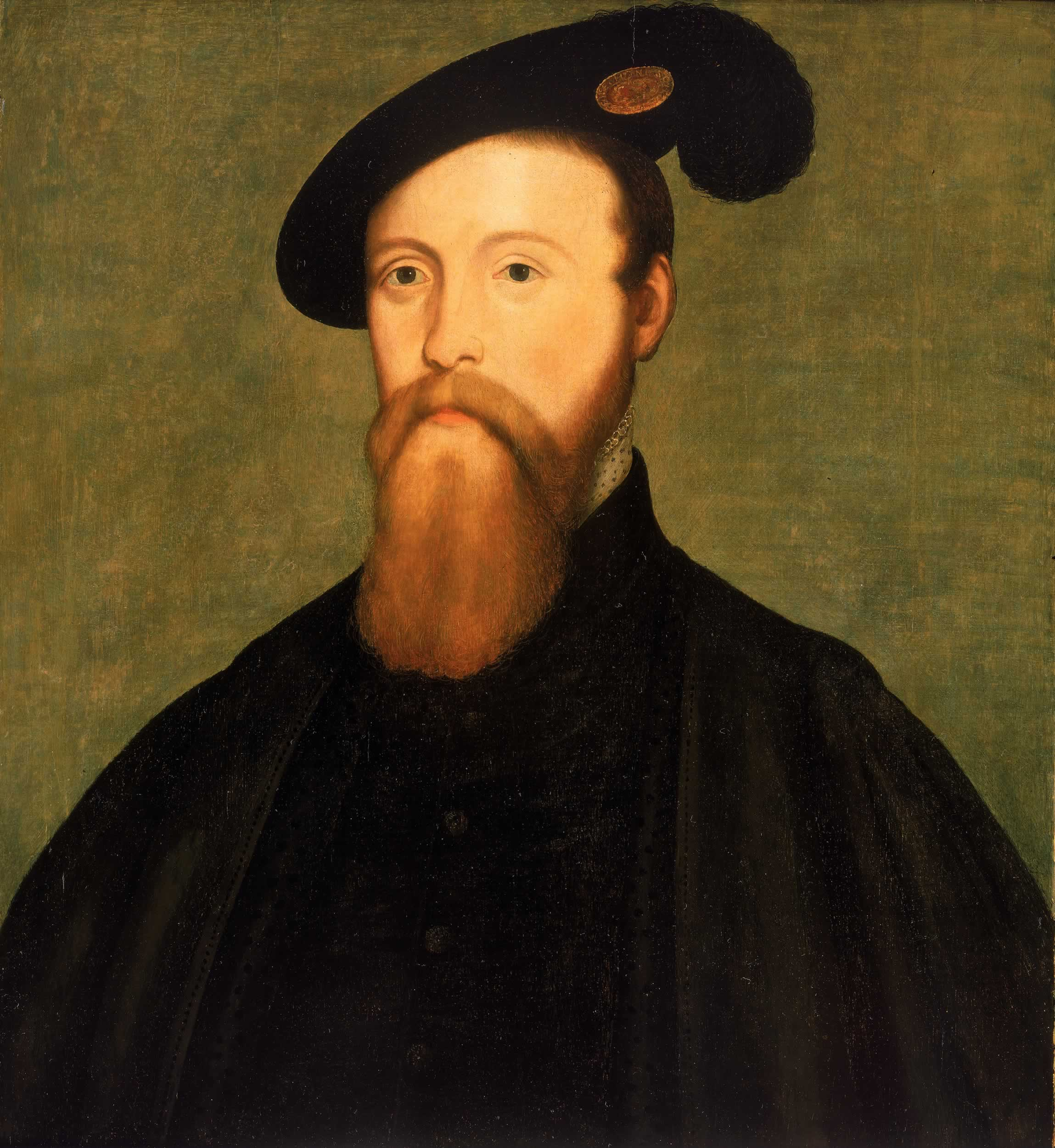
Thomas Seymour, 1st Baron Seymour of Sudeley

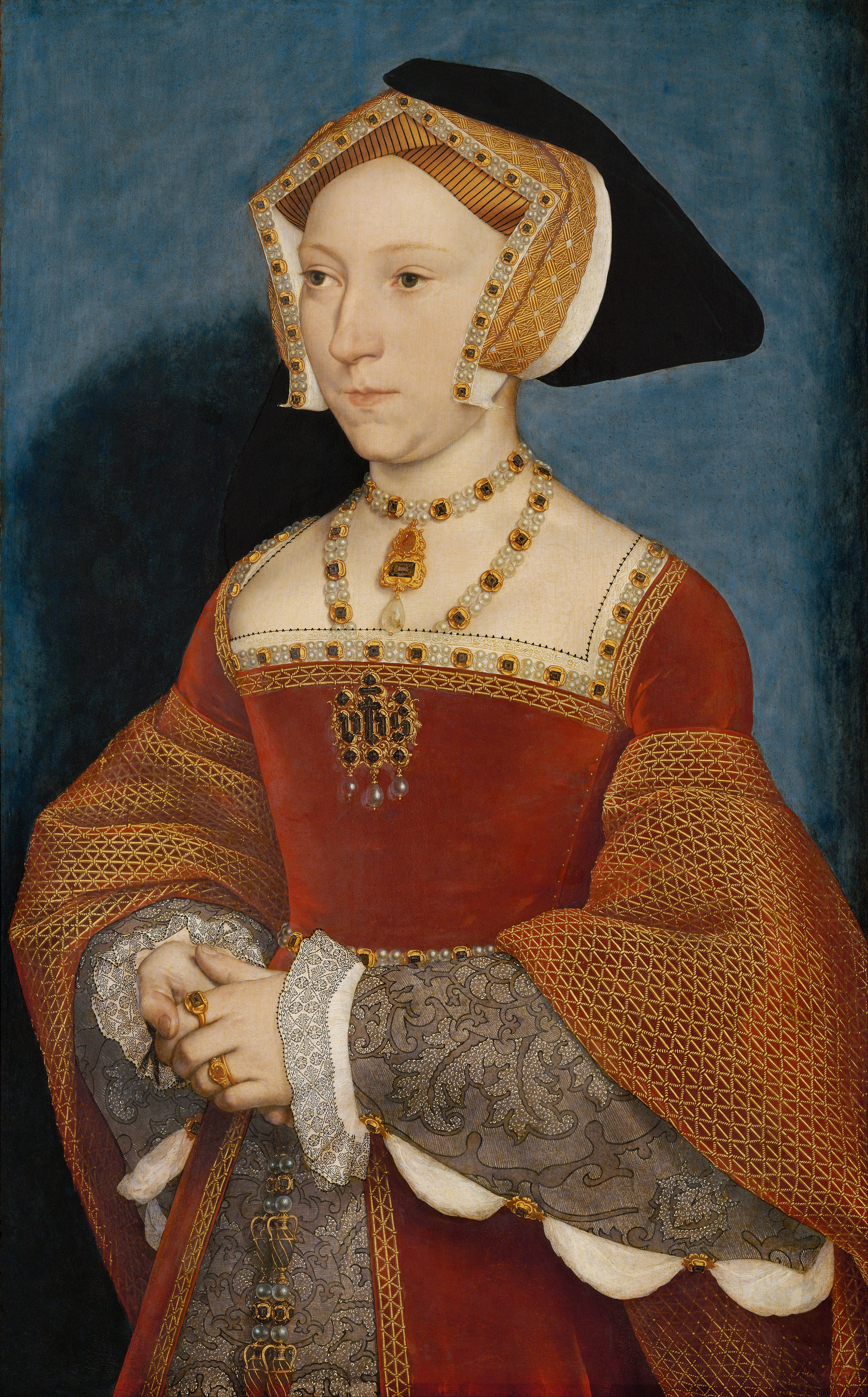
Jane Seymour, Queen of England, Hans Holbein the Younger

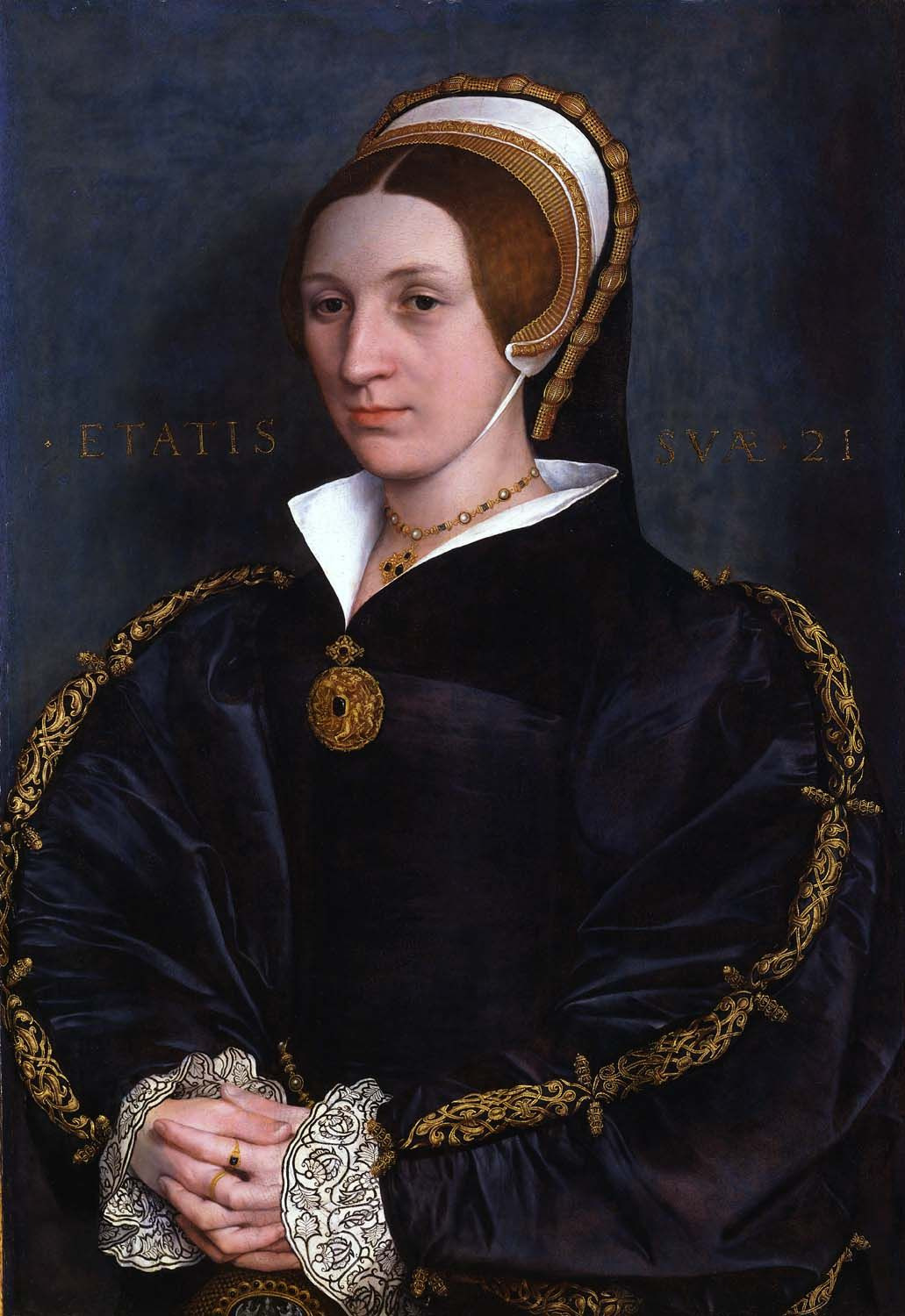
Portrait of a Lady, perhaps Elizabeth Seymour, Hans Holbein the Younger

== Death and burial ==
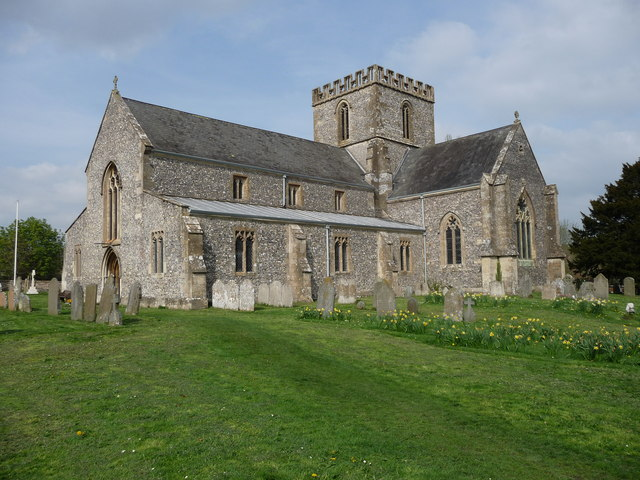
St Mary's, Great Bedwyn

Seymour died on 21 December 1536. By royal custom, his daughter Queen Jane did not attend the funeral. He was first buried in the church of Easton Priory, but following the collapse of that building was reburied in 1590 by his grandson, Edward Seymour, 1st Earl of Hertford, in St Mary's Church, Great Bedwyn, the parish church of Wulfhall, where his monument survives. The monument gives his age at death as sixty:

"This Knight departed this Lyfe at LX years of age, the XXI day of December, Anno 1536 and was firste buryed at Eston Priorie Churche amongst divers of his auncestors, bothe Seymours and Sturmyes..."

His eldest son and heir, Edward Seymour, inherited lands producing an income of £275 a year, equivalent to £196,338 in 2025.

=== Monument, Great Bedwyn ===
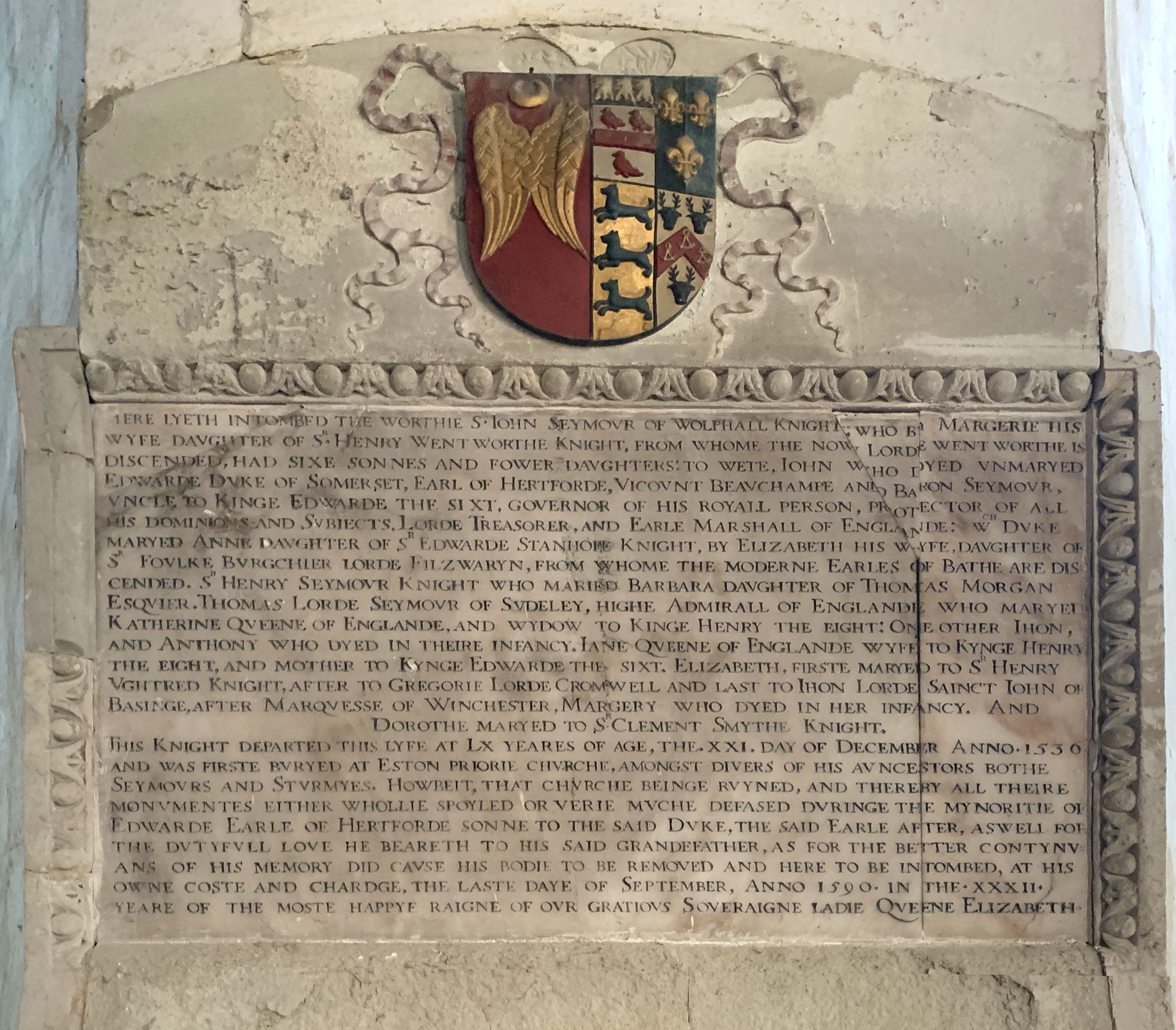
Tablet above Sir John Seymour's memorial

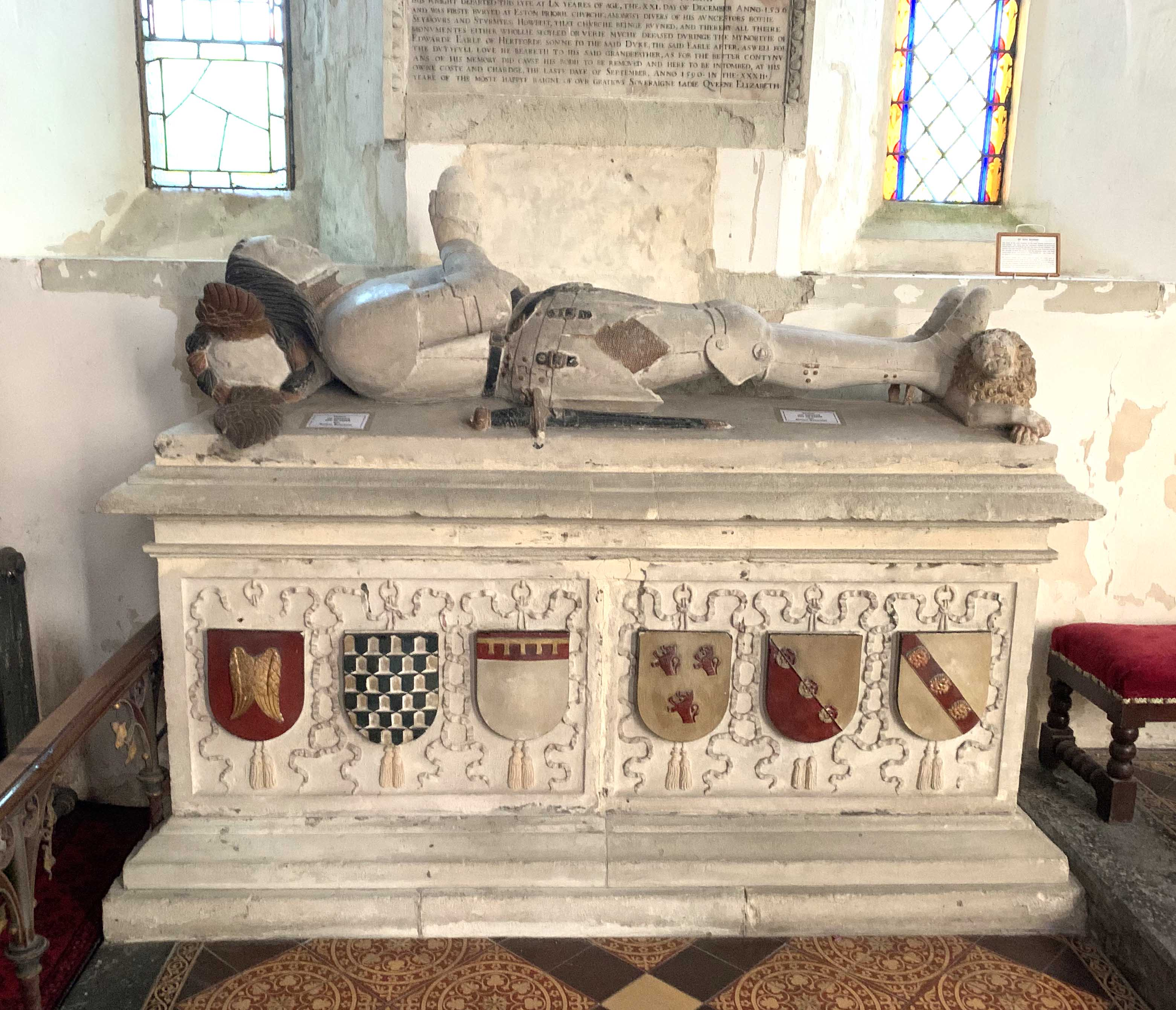
Tomb of Sir John Seymour

His monument in Great Bedwyn church consists of a chest tomb displaying heraldic escutcheons, surmounted by his recumbent effigy, fully dressed in armour with hands in prayer, his head resting on his helm from which projects the sculpted Seymour crest of a pair of wings. His feet rest on a lion, and a sword lies by his side. On the wall above is a tablet inscribed as follows:

"Here lyeth intombed the worthie Sr John Seymour of Wolfhall, Knight, who by Margerie his wyfe, daughter of Sr Henry Wentworthe, Knight, from whome the nowe Lorde Wentworthe is discended, had sixe sonnes and fower daughters, to wete, John who dyed unmaryed; Edwarde, Duke of Somerset, Earl of Hertforde, Vicount Beauchampe and Baron Seymour, uncle to Kinge Edwarde the Sixt, Governor of his Royall Person, Protector of all his Dominions and Subjects, Lorde Treasorer and Earle Marshall of Englande; w[i]ch Duke maryed Anne, daughter of Sr Edwarde Stanhope, Knight, by Elizabeth his wyfe, daughter of Sr Foulke Burgchier, Lorde Filzwaryn [sic], from whome the moderne Earles of Bathe are discended; Sr Henry Seymour, Knight, who maried Barbara daughter of Thomas Morgan, Esquier; Thomas Lorde Seymour of Sudeley, Highe Admirall of Englande, who maryed Katherine, Queene of Englande, and wydow to Kinge Henry the Eight. One other Jhon, and Anthony, who dyed in theire infancy. Jane Qveene of Englande, wyfe to Kynge Henry the Eight, and mother to Kynge Edwarde the Sixt; Elizabeth, firste maryed to Sr Henry Ughtred [sic], Knight, after to Gregorie, Lorde Cromwell, and last to Jhon Lorde Sainct John of Basinge [sic], after Marquesse of Winchester; Margery, who dyed in her infancy, and Dorothe, maryed to Sr Clement Smythe, Knight. This Knight departed this lyfe at LX yeares of age, the XXI day of December, Anno 1536, and was firste buryed at Eston Priorie Churche amongst divers of his auncestors, bothe Seymours and Sturmyes. Howbeit that Churche beinge ruyned, and thereby all theire monumentes either whollie spoyled, or verie much defased duringe the mynoritie of Edwarde, Earle of Hertforde, sonne to the said Duke, the said Earle after, as well for the dutyfull love he beareth to his said grandefather, as for the better contynuans of his memory, did cause his bodie to be removed, and here to be intombed at his own coste and chardge, the laste daye of September, Anno 1590, in the XXXII yeare of the moste happye raigne of our gratious Soveraigne Ladie Queene Elizabeth."

A transcript was made of the inscriptions of the Seymour monuments by the topographer John Aubrey on his visit to the church in 1672. He also recorded the heraldry on the monument at that date, much of which has been lost.

== Arms ==
Coat of arms of John Seymour
Notes From 1500 to 1525, his standard was red and in three compartments. "In the first on a wreath Or and sable, a peacock's head couped at the breast azure between two wings erect Or, with four leopards' heads Or. In the second two leopards' heads Or, and in the third ditto." Crest A pair of wings conjoined erect, Or. Escutcheon Gules, a pair of "angels' wynges" conjoined in lure, Or. Motto Foy pour devoir (French for 'Faith for duty')
