= John Seymour (1425–1463) =

English politician

Arms of Seymour: Gules, two wings conjoined in lure or

John Seymour of Stapleford in Wilton, Wiltshire, and of Wulfhall in Savernake Forest, Wiltshire (c. 1425 – c. 1463) was an English landowner and Member of Parliament.

== Life ==
Probably born at Wulfhall in Savernake Forest, Wiltshire, Seymour was the eldest son of Sir John Seymour of Wulfhall, Wiltshire, and of Hatch Beauchamp, Somerset (c. 1395 or 1402, died 20 December 1464) by his marriage on 30 July 1424 to Isabel William or Williams (died 14 April 1486), daughter of Mark William, a merchant and Mayor of Bristol, in Gloucestershire, in some sources given as William Macwilliam "of Gloucestershire".

He was a Knight of the Shire for Wiltshire and was High Sheriff of Wiltshire in 1450–1451 and 1457–1458.

== Marriage and issue ==
He married firstly Jane Arundell, without issue, and married secondly Elizabeth Coker or Croker (born c. 1436), daughter of Sir Robert Coker of Lydeard St Lawrence, Somerset, or daughter of Sir John Croker of Lineham (died 1506, son of Sir John Croker and Elizabeth Yeo) and Elizabeth Fortescue (born c. 1436, daughter of Sir Richard Fortescue and Agnes Windsor and widow of Sir Nicholas Carew of Haccombe), sister of William Croker and Anna Croker, wife of John Gilbert, and had three sons:

- John Seymour (c. 1450 – 26 October 1491), of Wulfhall, married firstly Elizabeth Darell or Darrell (born c. 1451), daughter of Sir George Darell or Darrell (died c. 1474) and Margaret Stourton (born c. 1433), a daughter of John Stourton, 1st Baron Stourton and Margery or Marjory Wadham, and had eight children, and married secondly a daughter of Robert Hardon and had one son:
  - Margaret Seymour (born Wulfhall, Wiltshire, c. 1468), married Sir Nicholas Wadham and had two children, Jane Wadham and Nicholas Wadham
  - Jane Seymour (born Wulfhall, Wiltshire, c. 1469), married John Huddlestone
  - Elizabeth Seymour (born Wulfhall, Wiltshire, c. 1471), married John Croft
  - John Seymour (1474–1536)
  - Catherine Seymour
  - Sir George Seymour, Kt., High Sheriff of Wiltshire in 1498
  - Robert Seymour
  - William Seymour (born Wulfhall, Wiltshire, c. 1478), married Margaret Byconnyll
  - Roger Seymour (Andover, Hampshire, c. 1480 – bef. 1509), married and had four daughters and one son:
    - Isabel/ Isobell Seymour (Marton, Kent, 1494-1525), married Richard Marsh/ Marche, had as sons John Marche, Thomas Marsh, and Henry Marsh/ Marche. Isabel was the 5th great-grandmother of William Rogers, of Rogers Plantation, Surry, Virginia
    - Agnes Seymour (born Andover, Hampshire, c. 1498), married Richard Forde
    - Margery Seymour (Andover, Hampshire, 1501-1520)
    - John Seymour (born Andover, Hampshire, 1502-1509)
    - Joan/ Jane Seymour (born Andover, Hampshire, c. 1503), married Thomas Corderay and had one son, Thomas Corderay (1520–1582);
- Alexander Seymour
- Humphrey Seymour, Esq., of Wendlebury, Oxfordshire, and of Even Swindon, Wiltshire (1453/1454 – living 1509), married Elizabeth Winslowe, daughter of Thomas Winslowe of Eldersfield, Worcestershire
