= Penhow =

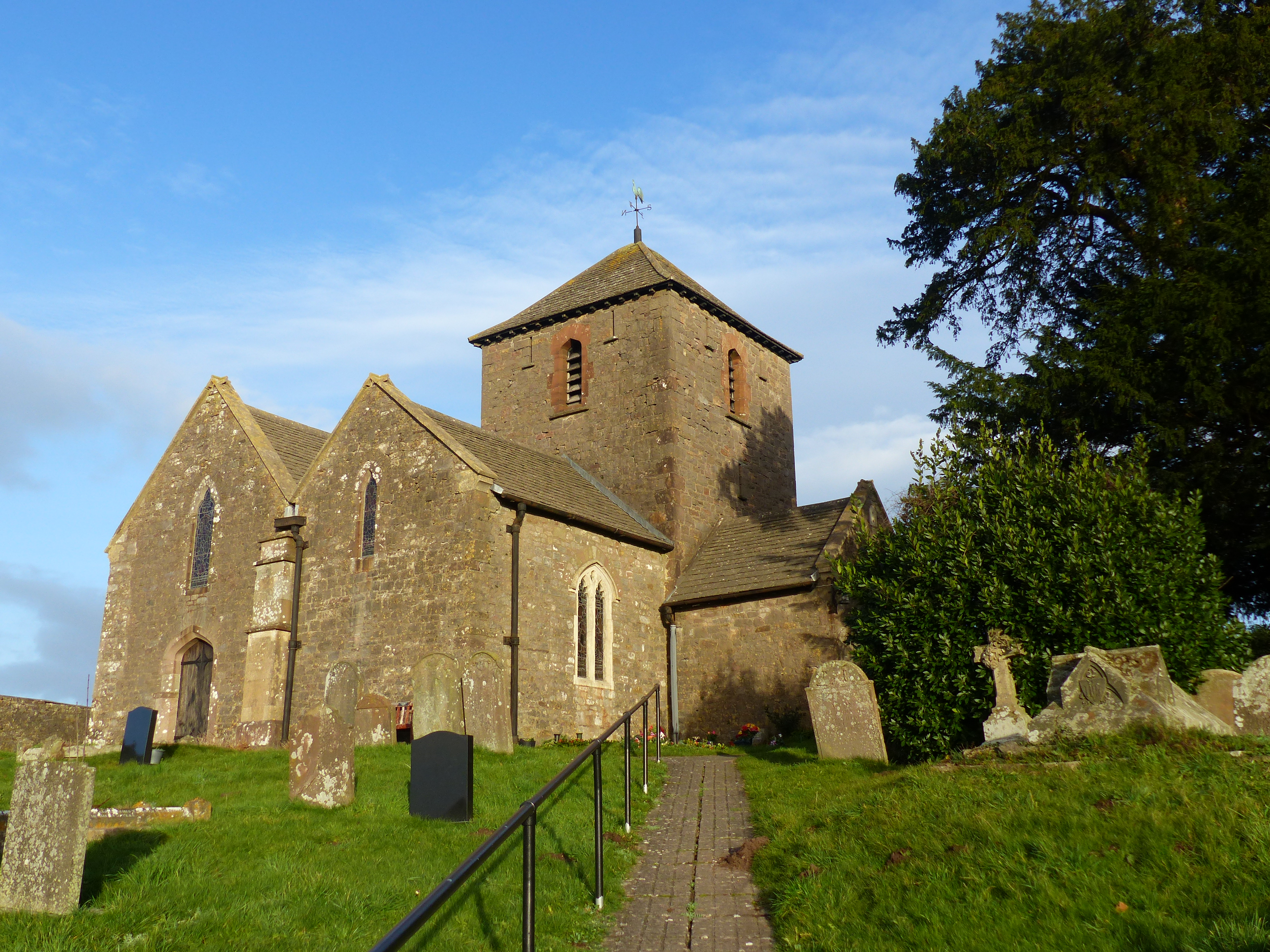
- Church of St John the Baptist

- Location within Newport
- Population: 744 (2011 census)
- Principal area: Newport
- Country: Wales
- Sovereign state: United Kingdom
- Post town: CALDICOT
- Postcode district: NP26
- Dialling code: 01633; Llanwern and Penhow exchanges
- Police: Gwent
- Fire: South Wales
- Ambulance: Welsh
- UK Parliament: Newport East
- Senedd Cymru – Welsh Parliament: Newport East
- List of places UK Wales Newport 51.61513°N 2.83497°W Map of the community

Penhow (Welsh: Pen-hw) is a small village, historic parish and community just inside the eastern edge of the boundary of the city of Newport, South Wales, within the historic county of Monmouthshire. The name Penhow is believed to be derived from the Welsh word pen meaning 'head' or 'top' and how from the Old English hō 'projecting ridge' in its dative form hōh 'place at the ridge'. The community includes the estate of Parc-Seymour. The Penhow Woodlands National Nature Reserve lies a short distance to the south of the village.

Penhow Quarry is operated by Hanson plc.

== History and architecture ==
=== Roman remains ===
Fragments of Roman building material have been found in the area. These include evidence of a Roman building at Llanvaches, an artefact at Penhow, and a Roman road at Parc-Seymour.

=== Penhow Castle ===
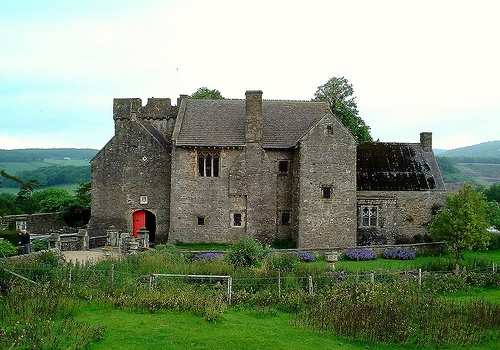
Penhow castle viewed from the parish church

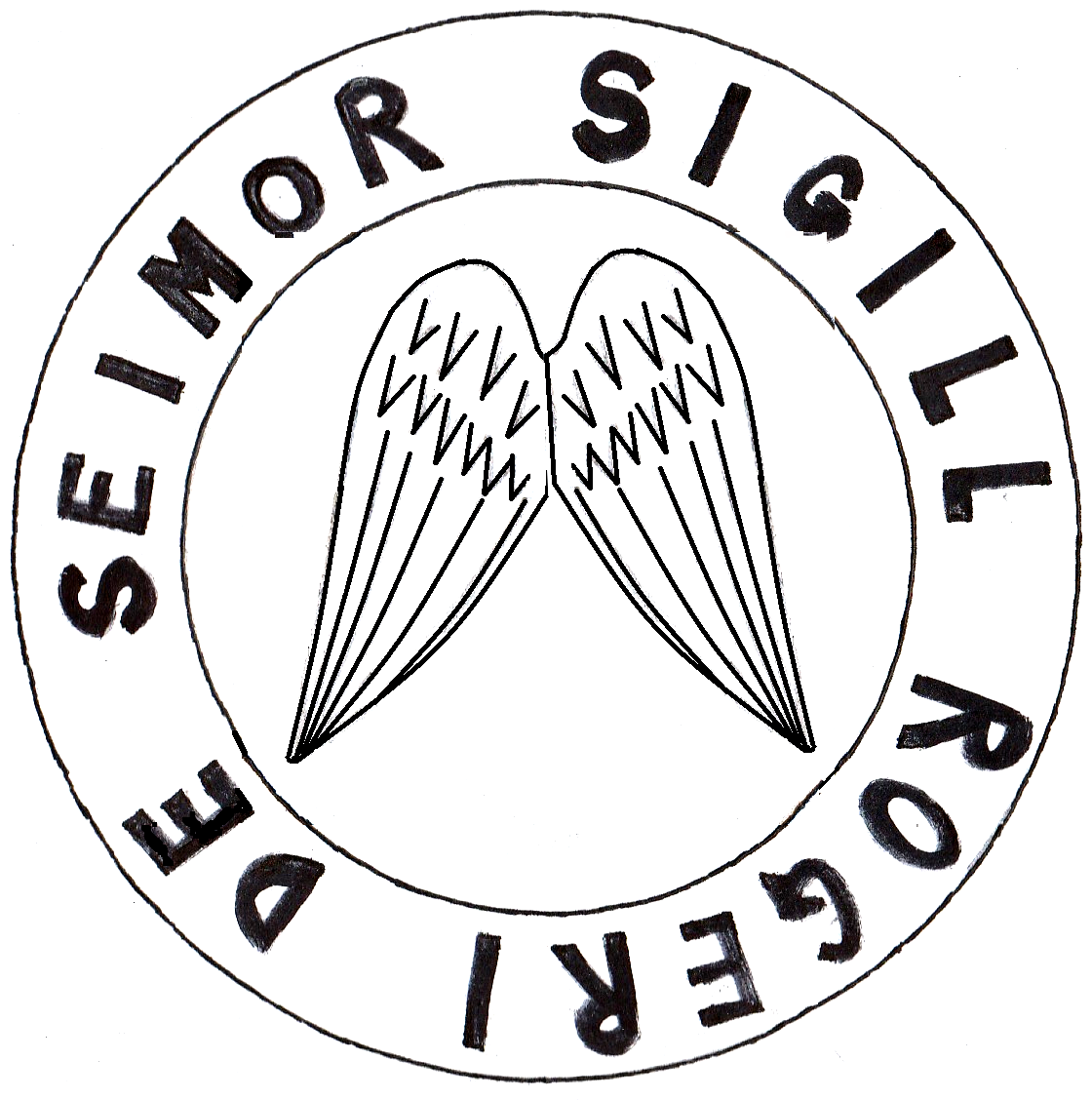
Recreation of seal reportedly used by Roger de Seymour (died c. 1299) of Undy and Penhow Castle, as reported by the Duchess of Cleveland in her Battle Abbey Roll (1889), showing the Seymour arms, the "Vol", Gules, two wings conjoined in lure or

Penhow is best known for Penhow Castle, which has claims to be the oldest inhabited castle in Wales. (Note: John Newman suggests Cardiff Castle, Fonmon Castle and St Donat's Castle as alternative claimants.) It was built by Sir Roger de St Maur, one of the Norman knights who served the Norman Lord of Striguil at Chepstow Castle. He built a tower house, and documentary evidence shows that he was at Penhow by 1129. It is the first known British home of the St Maur alias Seymour family which rose to national prominence in the 16th century in the person of Queen Jane Seymour, the third wife of King Henry VIII, represented today by the Duke of Somerset. Later the Seymour family, which moved to Hatch Beauchamp in Somerset and Wulfhall in Wiltshire, sold Penhow Castle to the Lewis family of St. Pierre, who converted the castle to a modern residence in 1674. Thomas Lewis' son Thomas was High Sheriff of the county, and married the daughter of Sir Richard Levett, Lord Mayor of London. The Lewis family retained ownership of Penhow Castle for several centuries.

The castle, which has a reputation for being haunted, was open to the public between 1978 and 2002.

=== Church of St. John the Baptist ===
The parish church of St. John the Baptist is next to the castle. It has 13th-century origins and was the subject of restoration work in the 19th century.

=== Village shop ===
Following the closure of the privately run shop in 2008, the Penhow Community banded together to finance and regenerate the village shop. Community volunteers redecorated, restocked and reopened the shop in November 2008. Since reopening, the shop has been managed and operated by the community and, where possible, stock has been sourced locally.

=== Rock and Fountain ===
The Rock and Fountain Inn is a 17th-century coaching inn on the edge of the village. The historic inn and its 5-acre (2.0 ha) site underwent a £1m renovation and redevelopment during 2010. The inn reopened as a steak and seafood restaurant in November 2010. It was later transformed into an Italian restaurant and closed a few years later. The Rock and Fountain opened again in June 2014.

In February 2018, the Indian restaurant (located behind the Rock and Fountain) closed and in April, the building was transformed into a churrascaria.

=== Penhow History Society ===
In 2016 a Penhow History Society was set up to examine Penhow's varied history. It was formed to research local history projects around the village and aims to promote a wider interest in its history through the publication of articles and organising public talks.

== Temperature record ==
Penhow formerly held the July record temperature for Wales of 34.2°C (93.5°F), set on 18 July 2006.

== Government ==
Penhow has a community council comprising eight members.

The area is part of the Bishton and Langstone ward for elections to Newport City Council.
