= Penhow Castle =

Castle in Newport, Wales

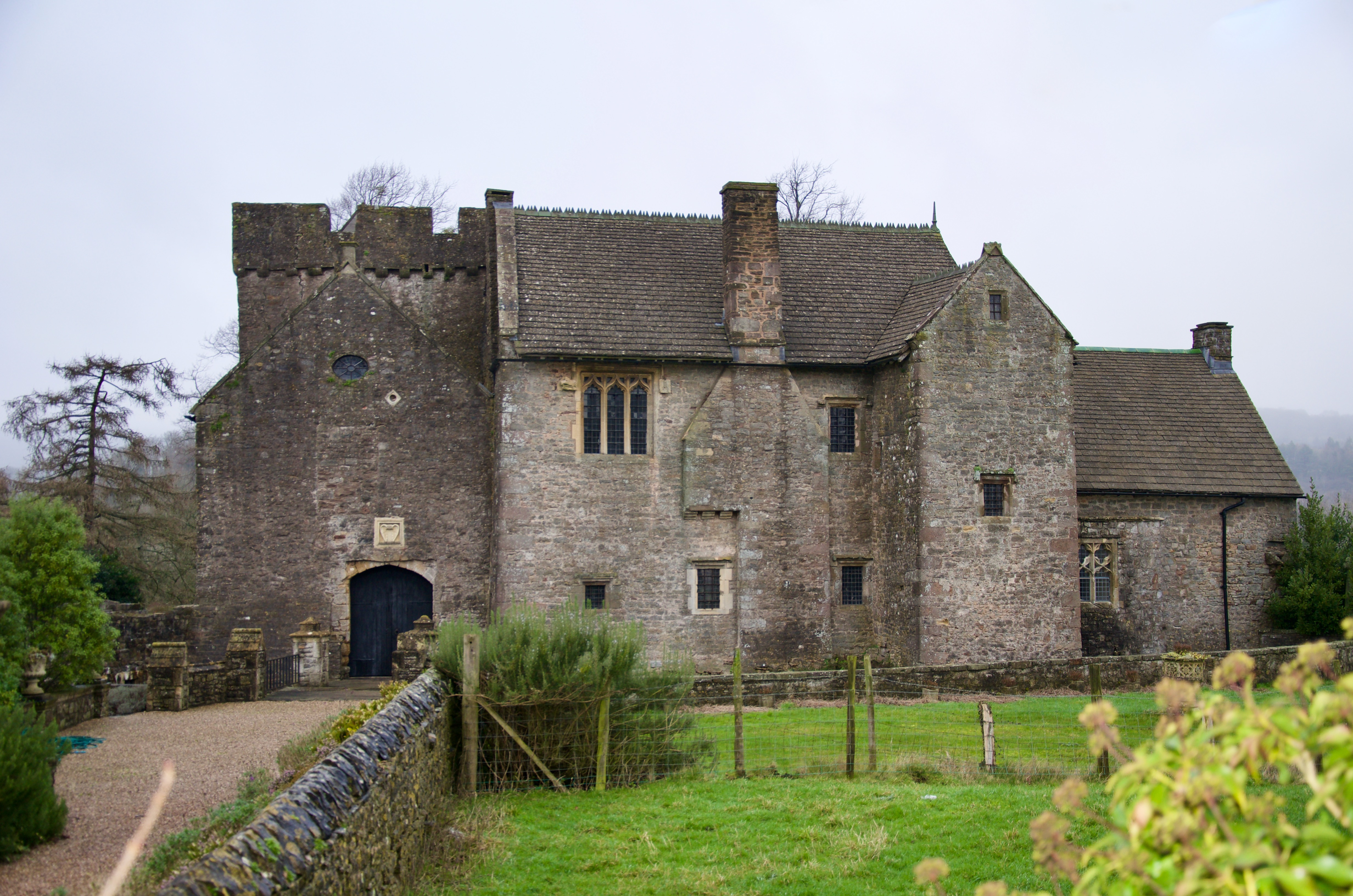

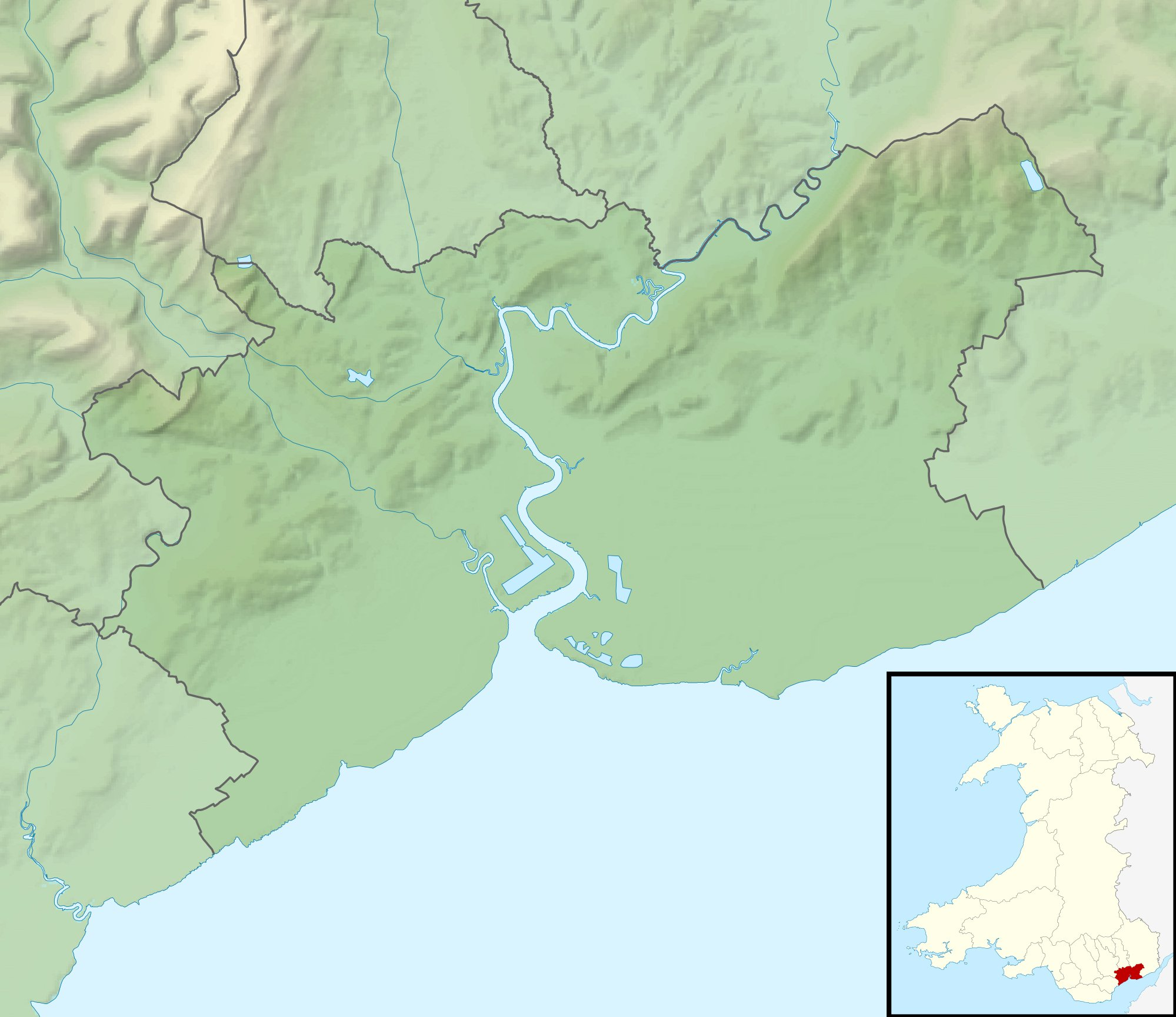
- Location within Newport
- 51.6137°N 2.8337°W
- Type: Castle
- Location: Penhow, Newport

History
- Built: 12th century onwards

Site notes
- Architectural style: castellated
- Governing body: Privately owned

Listed Building – Grade II*
- Official name: Penhow Castle
- Designated: 1 March 1963
- Reference no.: 3078

Listed Building – Grade II
- Official name: Barn to south-west of Penhow Castle
- Designated: 24 February 1976
- Reference no.: 3056

Listed Building – Grade II
- Official name: L-shaped Byre Range to south-west of Penhow Castle
- Designated: 24 February 1976
- Reference no.: 17079

Listed Building – Grade II
- Official name: Stable Block to far south-west of Penhow Castle
- Designated: 19 December 1995
- Reference no.: 17081

Listed Building – Grade II
- Official name: Five bay Barn and attached Byre to far south-west of Penhow Castle
- Designated: 19 December 1995
- Reference no.: 17080

Penhow Castle, Penhow, Newport dates from the early 12th century. Extended and reconstructed in almost every century since, it has been claimed to be the oldest continuously-inhabited castle in Wales. The castle is a Grade II* listed building.

== History ==
The manor of Penhow was held by Caradog ap Gruffydd, prince of Gwent at the time of the Norman invasion of Wales. The estate was seized by the Seymour family (anciently de St. Maur) and by 1129, Sir Roger de St Maur had built a fortified manor at the site. The house was extended and further fortified in the 15th and 17th centuries. In the 16th century, the manor passed to the Somersets. In 1674, it was purchased by the Lewis family of St Pierre. Viscount Rhondda, an industrialist and conservator of ancient buildings in Wales, bought the castle in 1914. By the mid-20th century, the castle was in a state of some dilapidation, until bought and restored by the film director Stephen Weeks. During his tenure, the castle was open to the public, while also serving as Weeks’ residence. In 2002, it was sold and reverted to a private home. Penhow is frequently claimed to be the oldest continuously inhabited castle in Wales. (Note: John Newman suggests Cardiff Castle, Fonmon Castle and St Donat's Castle as alternative claimants.)

== Architecture and description ==
The architectural historian John Newman, in his Gwent/Monmouthshire Pevsner, describes Penhow as "small and [un]convincingly defensive". It is constructed of local Old red sandstone rubble. The oldest portion of the castle is the west tower, which dates from the time of the Seymours. The two-storeyed hall range is later, of the 14th-15th centuries. Further large-scale remodelling took place in the 17th and 18th centuries, when the castle was refashioned as a comfortable country house. The Cadw listing records notes the "exceptionally fine Restoration period interiors”. The castle is listed Grade II*.

Two ranges of ancillary buildings contain some important agricultural structures, each with their own listings. The grouping immediately to the south-west of the castle includes a barn and a byre. The grouping further from the castle to the south includes an additional barn, another byre and a stable block.

== Sources ==
- Newman, John (1995). Glamorgan. The Buildings of Wales. London: Penguin Books. ISBN 9780140710564. OCLC 231881843.
- — (2000). Gwent/Monmouthshire. The Buildings of Wales. London: Penguin. ISBN 0-14-071053-1.
