= John Seymour (died 1464) =

Arms of Seymour: Gules, two wings conjoined in lure or

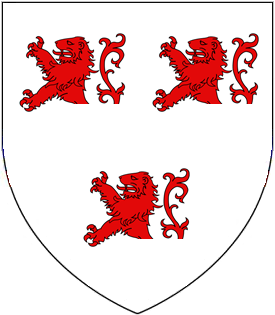
arms of Esturmy: Argent, three demi-lions rampant gules

Sir John Seymour (c. 1395/1402 – 20 December 1464) of Wulfhall in Savernake Forest, Wiltshire, feudal baron of Hatch Beauchamp in Somerset, England, was a Member of Parliament.

== Origins ==
He was the son and heir of Roger Seymour (c. 1367/70-1420) of Hatch Beauchamp by his wife Maud Esturney (or Esturmi), daughter and heiress of Sir William Esturmy, Speaker of the House of Commons.

== Career ==
He was elected as a Member of Parliament for Ludgershall in 1422 and as Knight of the Shire for Wiltshire in 1435, 1439, and 1445. He served as Sheriff of Wiltshire in 1431–2, having previously served as Sheriff of Hampshire.

A tenement in Redcliffe Street, Bristol, was held by Sir John Seymour, Knight, in 1454, and by Lady Seymour in 1469.

== Marriage and issue ==
Arms of Macwilliam of Gloucestershire: Party per bend argent and gules, three roses bendwise counter-changed, as later quartered by Queen Jane Seymour

On 20/30 July 1424 he married Isabel William or Williams (died 14 April 1486), daughter and heiress of Mark William, a merchant who served as Mayor of Bristol, in Gloucestershire, in some sources given as William Mac William or Williams "of Gloucestershire". After her husband's death in 1464, Isabel took vows of chastity. By his wife he had two children:

- John Seymour (1425–1463), son and heir apparent who predeceased his father, leaving a son John Seymour (died 1491), the grandfather of Queen Jane Seymour (c. 1508–1537), third wife of King Henry VIII and mother of King Edward VI.
- Margaret Seymour (born c. 1428), who married Edmund (Edward) Blount

== Death and succession ==
He died on 20 December 1464 and was succeeded by his grandson John Seymour (died 1491).
