= John Seymour (died 1491) =

British landowner (15th century)

Arms of Seymour: Gules, two wings conjoined in lure or

John Seymour (c. 1450 – 26 October 1491) of Wulfhall, of Stalbridge, of Stinchcombe and of Huish, all in Wiltshire, England, was warden of Savernake Forest and a prominent member of the landed gentry in the counties of Wiltshire, Somerset and Dorset. He was the grandfather of Jane Seymour (c. 1508–1537), the third wife of King Henry VIII, and was thus great-grandfather of King Edward VI.

== Origins ==
Seymour was the eldest of the three sons of John Seymour (c. 1425–1463), Knight of the Shire for Wiltshire and High Sheriff of Wiltshire, by his wife Elizabeth Coker (born about 1436), daughter of Sir Robert Coker of Lydeard St Lawrence, Somerset.

Seymour's father predeceased his own father John Seymour (died 1464), and thus in 1464, Seymour succeeded to his grandfather's estates.

== Career ==
As warden of Savernake Forest, Seymour tried to restore the ancient boundaries of his bailiwick. At the forest eyre at Marlborough in 1464, and at the following eyre in 1477, he made wild claims. In June 1485 he was able to obtain letters patent to establish "the bounds of the Forest of Savernake before the perambulation of Henry III", and at the eyre of 1491 he used this to claim that the Farm and West bailiwicks of the forest extended from the Ridgeway and Pewsey in the west to the edge of Hungerford in the east.

In 1489, on the death of his cousin Margaret Coker, the wife of Sir Reynold Stourton, Seymour inherited the Somerset manors of West Bower in Bridgwater, Moorland in North Petherton, and Cokers in Wembdon.

== Marriage and children ==
Seymour married twice. His first marriage was to Elizabeth Darrell (born c. 1451), daughter of Sir George Darrell (died c. 1474) of Littlecote, Wiltshire, by his first wife Margaret Stourton (born c. 1433), a daughter of John Stourton, 1st Baron Stourton, and of Margery or Marjory Wadham. By Elizabeth Darrell, Seymour had four sons and four daughters, including:

- Sir John Seymour (1474–1536), knighted in 1497 after the Battle of Deptford Bridge, the father of Queen Jane Seymour (1508–1537)
- Sir George Seymour, Sheriff of Wiltshire in 1498
- Robert Seymour
- Sir William Seymour KB (c. 1478 – c. 1503), married Margaret Byconnyll
- Margaret Seymour (born c. 1468), who married (as his second wife) Sir Nicholas Wadham (died 1542) of Merryfield in the parish of Ilton in Somerset and Edge in the parish of Branscombe, Devon, MP for Somerset in 1529, and Captain of the Isle of Wight 1509–1520
- Jane Seymour (born c. 1469), married John Huddlestone of Cumberland
- Elizabeth Seymour (born c. 1471), married John Crofts, Esquire
- Catherine Seymour, who died unmarried

Seymour's second marriage was to a daughter of Robert Hardon by whom he had one son, Roger Seymour (c. 1480 – before 1509), of Andover, Hampshire.
