= William Esturmy =

Member of the Parliament of England

arms of Esturmy: Argent, three demi-lions rampant gules

Sir William Esturmy alias Sturmy (c. 1356 – 21 March 1427) of Wolfhall, Wiltshire was an English Knight of the Shire, Speaker of the House of Commons, and hereditary Warden of the royal forest of Savernake, Wiltshire.

== Origins ==
He was born in about 1356, the son of Geoffrey Sturmy (d. 1381) and nephew and heir of Sir Henry Sturmy of Wolfhall in the Savernake Forest, Wiltshire.

== Career ==
He succeeded his uncle in 1381 which brought him manors throughout Wiltshire, including Elvetham in the north of the county, where he created a 300-acre park, and Wolfhall and other manors in the east. He was knighted by October 1388. He held the post of hereditary warden of Savernake Forest from 1381 to 1417 and from 1420 until his death in 1427.

Between 1384 and 1422 he served as knight of the shire eight times for Wiltshire, twice for Hampshire (1384 and 1390) and twice for Devon (1391 and 1404). He was elected Speaker of the House of Commons in 1404 during the reign of King Henry IV, known as the Illiterate or Unlearned Parliament because the king forbade lawyers from attending. He was appointed High Sheriff of Wiltshire for 1418–19.

He held a number of public commissions and served several times as an ambassador abroad.

== Marriage and children ==
He married Joan Crawthorne (d. 20 February 1429), the widow of Sir John Beaumont of Shirwell and Saunton in North Devon, by whom he had no sons, only two daughters and co-heiresses:

- Maud Esturmy, wife of Roger II Seymour (1366–1420), of Hatch Beauchamp in Somerset, by whom she had a son John Seymour (d.1464).
- Agnes Esturmy, wife of William Ringbourne and subsequently of John Holcombe.

== Death ==
He died at Elvetham on 21 March 1427 and was buried at Easton Priory near Wolfhall. His heirs were his daughter Agnes (the wife of John Holcombe) and John Seymour (the son of Maud).

Political offices
Preceded by Arnold Savage	Speaker of the House of Commons; 1404	Succeeded by John Tiptoft
