= Wulfhall =

17th-century manor house in Burbage, Wiltshire, England

Wulfhall Farmhouse
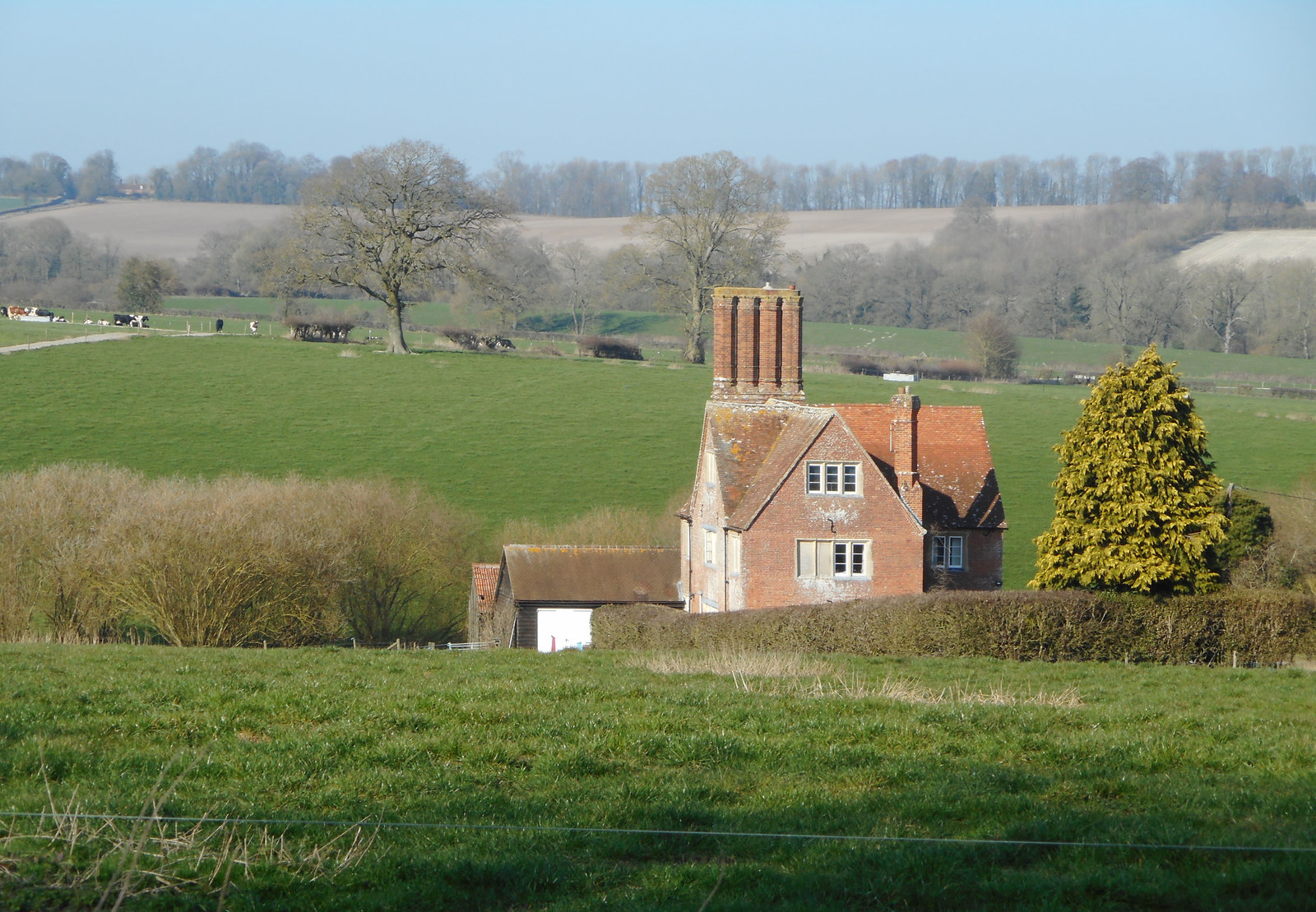

- Location within Wiltshire
- 51°21′18″N 1°39′14″W
- Location: Burbage, Wiltshire
- OS grid reference: SU 24162 62107

Site notes
- Architectural style: Victorian architecture
- Owner: Binney family

Listed Building – Grade II
- Designated: 27 February 1998
- Reference no.: 1031619

Wulfhall or Wolfhall is an early 17th-century manor house in Burbage parish, Wiltshire, England. It is north-east of Burbage village, and about 5 miles (8 km) south-east of Marlborough. A previous manor house on the same site, at that time in the parish of Great Bedwyn, was the seat of the Seymour family, a member of which, Jane Seymour, was queen to King Henry VIII.

== Late medieval and Tudor manor house ==
Arms of Seymour

The medieval manor house was probably a timber framed double courtyard house, incorporating two towers (demolished 1569), a long gallery, a chapel, and several other rooms. It was built in the early 1530s with financial assistance from Thomas Cromwell and King Henry VIII.

The Seymours reached the peak of their influence in the 16th century, when Jane Seymour became the third wife of King Henry VIII. Her son became Edward VI and ruled England from 1547 to 1553. At the beginning of Edward's reign, he was nine years old and his eldest uncle, the 1st Duke of Somerset, was Lord Protector of England, while another uncle, the 1st Baron Seymour of Sudeley, married Henry VIII's widow, Catherine Parr. Both Somerset and Baron Seymour of Sudeley were eventually executed for treason.

Henry VIII stayed at Wulfhall during his royal progress of 1535, and it has been suggested this may have been when he first courted Jane Seymour, though there is no real evidence to support the proposition. At this time, Henry’s second wife Anne Boleyn failed to produce a son and heir, which may have led eventually to the decision to execute her. There is a belief arising from the writing of 19th-century antiquary John Britton that Henry and Jane held a wedding feast in the Long Barn at Wulfhall. They were in fact married in the Queen's Closet at Whitehall Palace in London. However, the barn at Wulfhall was decorated with painted canvas during the visit of Henry VIII and his household in August 1539.

The Duke of Somerset desired grander accommodation than Wulfhall could provide, and intended to replace the house with a new mansion on a nearby hill, Bedwyn Brail, with design and construction supervised by his steward, Sir John Thynne, founder of Longleat House. A correspondence survives, dated between November 1548 and June 1549, that shows Thynne directing the plans. The mansion was unfinished when Somerset fell from power, and was abandoned after his execution in January 1552. His son Edward was unable to maintain Wulfhall, which rapidly deteriorated.

Wulfhall was "derelict and abandoned after 1571" as the family had relocated to nearby Tottenham Park. A rabbit warren was constructed in the grounds in 1573. The house was used as accommodation for servants until considerably reduced in size in the 1660s and demolished in 1723. A few ruins survived until the beginning of the 20th century, but nothing now remains above ground; the foundations were uncovered in a 2017–18 excavation. The barn where Henry and Jane supposedly held a feast to celebrate their marriage burnt down in the 1920s.

== Present manor house ==
The present manor house dates back to the early 17th century, having started life as a simple farmhouse. It was expanded in the 18th century and has a Victorian façade.

The current owners of the manor house are the Binney family, who inherited the property on the death of their mother in 2013. Seven people live in the main house, which has been partitioned for tenants. In February 2015, Dominic Binney said, "Over the years we have had many people feeling a presence here that makes their hair stand on end – something that is definitely not explained by an old house's sounds and creaky floorboards. I've absolutely felt and heard unexplained things. We had mediums and psychics come here to chase the ghosts away."

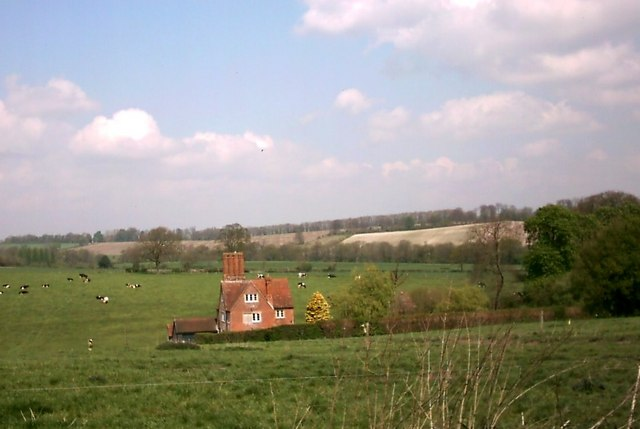
Wulfhall Farm in 2004

A neighbouring farmhouse named Wolfhall Farm stands on a minor road leading away, east-north-east, from Burbage towards Crofton, where it crosses the Kennet and Avon Canal and the railway. The farmhouse is some 200 yards (180 m) from the site of Wulfhall and dates from the late 16th century.

== In fiction ==
Wulfhall is the inspiration for the title of Wolf Hall, the Man Booker Prize-winning novel by English author Hilary Mantel, as well as its sequel, Bring Up the Bodies, which also won the Man Booker Prize and begins with the 1535 arrival of the King at Wolf Hall.
