= List of poor law unions in Wales =

This article lists all Welsh Poor Law Unions. Note for table: 'PLU' stands for Poor Law Union and 'PLP' stands for Poor Law Parish.

== Anglesey ==
Link to 1888 map showing Anglesey PLUs; Link to 1909 map showing Anglesey PLUs; Link to 1924 map showing Anglesey PLUs

Name	Civil Parishes	Notes
Anglesey PLU	Amlwch, Bodewryd, Ceidio, Coedana, Llanallgo, Llanbabo, Llanbadrig, Llanbedr-Gôch, Llanddyfnan, Llandyfrydog, Llaneilian, Llanerchymedd, Llaneugrad, Llanfair-Mathafarn-Eithaf, Llanfair-Ynghornwy + 2 detached islands, Llanfechell, Llanfflewyn, Llanfihangel-Trer-Beirdd, Llangefni, Llangwyllog, Llanrhwydrys, Llanwenllwyfo, Llanwenllwyfo, Llechcynfarwy, Penrhos-Lligwy, Rhôsbeirio, Tregaian.	
Bangor & Beaumaris PLU	Beaumaris, Llanddanielfab, Llanddona, Llandegfan, Llandysilio, Llanedwen, Llanfaes, Llanfair-Pwllgwyngyll, Llanffinan, Llanfihangel Dinsylwy, Llanfihangel-Esgeifiog + detached portion, Llangadwaladr, Llangoed, Llangristiolus, Llaniestyn, Llansadwrn, Penmôn + detached island, Penmynydd, Pentraeth, Trefdraeth.	Remainder of PLU in Carnarvonshire.
Caernarvon PLU	Llanfair-y-Cwmwd, Llangaffo, Llangeinwen, Llanidan, Newborough + detached island.	Remainder of PLU in Carnarvonshire.
Holyhead PLU	Aberffraw, Bodedern, Bodwrog, Ceirchiog, Cerrigceinwen, Heneglwys, Holyhead (Caergybi), Llanbeulan, Llandeusant, Llandrygarn, Llanfachraeth, Llanfaelog, Llanfaethlu, Llanfair-Yn-Neubwll, Llanfihangel-Yn-Nhowyn, Llanfu-Gail, Llanfwrog, Llangwyfan, Llanllibio, Llanrhuddlad, Llantrisant, Llanynghenedl, Llechylched, Rhoscolyn, Trewalchmai.	

== Brecknockshire ==
Link to 1888 map showing Brecknockshire PLUs; Link to 1909 map showing Brecknockshire PLUs; Link to 1925 map showing Brecknockshire PLUs

Name	Civil Parishes	Notes
Brecknock PLU	Aberyscir, Battle, Cantref, Castle Inn Brecknock, Cathedine, Christ’s College Brecknock, Cray, Garthbrengy, Glyn, Glyntawe, Llanddetty, Llanddew, Llandefaelog-Fach, Llandefaelog-Tre’r-Graig, Llandefalle, Llandeilo’r-Fan, Llanfeigan, Llanfihangel-Fechan, Llanfihangel-Nant-Brân, Llanfihangel-Tal-y-Llyn, Llanfilo, Llanfrynach, Llangasty-Tal-y-Llyn, Llangorse, Llanhamlach, Llansantffread, Llanspyddyd, Llan-y-Wern, Maescar, Merthyr Cynog, Modrydd, Penpont, Senny, St David Brecknock, St John the Evangelist Brecknock, St Mary Brecknock, Talachddu, Traian Glas, Traian Mawr, Trallong, Trawsooed, Venny-Fach, Ysclydach.	
Builth PLU	Alltmawr, Builth, Crickadarn, Gwarafog, Gwenddwr + detached island, Llanafan-Fawr, Llanafan-Fechan, Llanddewi Abergwesyn, Llanfihangel Abergwesyn, Llanfihangel-Bryn-Pabuan, Llanganten, Llangynog, Llanlleonfel, Llanynys, Llysdinam, Maesmynys, Penbuallt, Rhosferig, Treflis.	Remainder of PLU in Radnorshire.
Crickhowell PLU	Crickhowell, Grwyne-Fawr, Grwyne-Fechan, Llanbedr, Llanelly, Llanfihangel-Cwm-Du, Llangattwg, Llangenny, Llangynidr, Partrishow.	
Hay PLU	Aberllynfi, Bronllys, Glyn Fach, Hay, Llanelieu, Llanigon, Llyswen, Pipton, Talgarth, Tregoed & Felindre.	Remainder of PLU in Radnorshire, Wales & Herefordshire, England.
Llandovery PLU	Llandulas, Llanwrtyd.	Remainder of PLU in Carmarthenshire.
Merthyr Tydfil PLU	Penderyn, Vaynor (Faenor).	Remainder of PLU in Glamorganshire.
Neath PLU	Ystradfellte.	Remainder of PLU in Glamorganshire.
Pontardawe PLU	Ystradgynlais Higher, Ystradgynlais Lower.	Remainder of PLU in Glamorganshire.
Rhayader PLU	Llanwrthwl.	Remainder of PLU in Radnorshire.

== Caernarvonshire ==
Link to 1888 map showing Carnarvonshire PLUs; Link to 1909 map showing Carnarvonshire PLUs; Link to 1924 map showing Carnarvonshire PLUs

Name	Civil Parishes	Notes
Bangor & Beaumaris PLU	Aber, Bangor, Bethesda, Llandegai, Llanfairfechan, Llanllechid.	Remainder of PLU in Anglesey.
Caernarvon PLU	Bettws Garmon, Clynnog, Llanbeblig, Llanberis, Llanddeiniolen, Llandwrog, Llanfaglan, Llanfair-Is-Gaer, Llanllyfni, Llanrug, Llanwnda.	Remainder of PLU in Anglesey.
Conway PLU	Caerhûn, Conway, Dolgarrog + detached portion, Dwygyfylchi, Eglwys Rhos, Eirias, Gyffin, Llanbedr, Llandudno, Llangelynin, Llangwystenin, Llysfaen.	Remainder of PLU in Denbighshire.
Ffestiniog PLU	Beddgelert (Caernarvonshire portion), Dolbenmaen, Treflys, Yhys Cynhaiarn.	Remainder of PLU in Merionethshire.
Llanrwst PLU	Bettws-y-Coed, Dolwyddelan, Eidda, Gwydir, Llanrhwchwyn + 2 detached portions, Maenan, Penmachno, The Abbey, Trefriw + 3 detached portions.	Remainder of PLU in Denbighshire.
Pwllheli PLU	Aberdaron + detached island, Abererch, Bodfean, Bodferin, Bottwnog, Bryncroes, Capel Ceidio, Carnguwch, Criccieth + detached portion, Deneio, Edeyrn, Llanaelhaiarn, Llanarmon, Llanbedrog, Llandegwning, Llandudwen + detached portion, Llanengan + 2 detached islands, Llanfaelrhys + detached portion, Llanfihangel Bachellaeth, Llangian, Llangwnadl, Llangybi, Llaniestyn, Llanor, Llanystumdwy + detached portion, Meyllteyrn, Nevin, Penllech, Penrhos, Pistyll, Rhiw with Llanfaelrhys, Tudweiliog.	

== Cardiganshire ==
Link to 1888 map showing Cardiganshire PLUs; Link to 1909 map showing Cardiganshire PLUs; Link to 1925 map showing Cardiganshire PLUs

Name	Civil Parishes	Notes
Aberaeron PLU	Cilcennin, Ciliau-Aeron, Cydplwyf, Dihewid, Henfynyw, Llanarth, Llanbadarn-Trefeglwys, Llanddewi-Aberarth, Llandyssiliogogo, Llanerch-Aeron, Llanfihangel-Ystrad, Llanina, Llanllwchaiarn, Llansantffraid.	
Aberystwyth PLU	Aberystwyth, Broncastellan, Ceulan-y-Maesmawr, Clarach, Cwmrheidol, Cyfoeth-y-Brenin, Cynull-Mawr, Elerch, Henllys, Isa’n-Dre, Llanafan, Llancynfelyn, Llanddeiniol, Llangwyryfon, Llanilar, Llanrhystyd Haminiog, Llanrhystyd Mefenydd, Llanychaiarn, Lower Llanbadarn-y-Creuddyn, Lower Llanfihangel-y-Creuddyn, Lower Vaenor, Melindwr, Parcel-Canol, Rhostie, Tir-y-Mynach, Trefeirig, Ucha’n-Dre, Upper Llanbadarn-y-Creuddyn, Upper Llanfihangel-y-Creuddyn, Upper Vaenor.	
Cardigan PLU	Aberporth, Blaenporth, Cardigan Island, Llandygwydd, Llangoedmor, Llechryd, Mount, St Mary Cardigan, Tremain, Verwick.	Remainder of PLU in Pembrokeshire.
Lampeter (Llanbedr) PLU	Bettws-Bledrws, Cellan, Lampeter (Llanbedr), Llanfair-Clydogau, Llangybi, Llanwenog, Llanwnen, Silian, Trefilan.	Remainder of PLU in Carmarthenshire.
Machynlleth PLU	Ysgubor-y-Coed.	Remainder of PLU in Merionethshire & Montgomeryshire.
Newcastle in Emlyn PLU	Bangor, Bettws-Evan, Brongwyn, Henllan, Llandyfriog, Llandyssil, Llanfair-Orllwyn, Llanfair-Treflygen, Llangranog, Llangynllo, Penbryn, Troedyraur + detached portion.	Remainder of PLU in Carmarthenshire & Pembrokeshire.
Tregaron PLU	Bettws-Lleucu, Blaenpenal, Caron-Îs-Clawdd, Caron-Uwch-Clawdd, Doethie-Camddwr, Doethie-Pysgotwr, Garth & Ystrad, Gartheli, Gogoyan, Gorwydd, Gwynfil, Llanbadarn-Odwyn, Llangeitho, Llanio, Lower Gwnnws, Lower Lledrod, Nantcwnlle, Prysg & Carfan, Upper Gwnnws, Upper Lledrod, Yspytty-Ystwyth, Ystrad-Meurig.	

== Carmarthenshire ==
Link to 1888 map showing Carmarthenshire PLUs; Link to 1925 map showing Carmarthenshire PLUs

Name	Civil Parishes	Notes
Carmarthen PLU	Abergwili, Abernant, Conwil Elvet, Langunnor, Laugharne, Llanarthney, Llandawke, Llanddarog, Llandilo-Abercywyn, Llandowror, Llandyfaelog, Llanfihangel-Abercywyn, Llangain, Llangyndeyrn, Llangynin, Llangynog, Llanllawddog, Llanpumsaint, Llansadurnen, Llanstephan, Llanwinio, Merthyr, Mydrim, Newchurch, St Clears, St Ishmael, St Peter Carmarthen, Trelech-Ar-Bettws.	
Lampeter (Llanbedr) PLU	Llanfihangel Rhos-y-Corn, Llanllwni, Llanybyther, Llanycrwys, Pencarreg.	Remainder of PLU in Cardiganshire.
Llandeilo Fawr PLU	Bettws, Breghea, Lands belonging in equal proportions to Llandybie and Llandilo Fawr, Llandilo Fawr + detached portion, Llandybie, Llandyfeisant, Llanegwad, Llanfihangel Aberbythych, Llanfihangel Cilfarcen, Llanfynydd, Llangathen, Llansawel, Quarter Bach, Talley.	
Llandovery PLU	Cilycwm, Conwil Gaio, Llanddeusant, Llandingat, Llanfair-Ar-y-Bryn, Llangadock, Llansadwrn, Llanwrda, Myddfai.	Remainder of PLU in Breconshire.
Llanelli PLU	Kidwelly St Mary, Llanedy, Llanelly, Llangennech, Llannon, Pen-Bre.	Remainder of PLU in Glamorganshire.
Narberth PLU	Castelldwyran, Cilymaenllwyd, Cyffic, Eglwys-Cymmyn, Eglwysfair-a-Churig, Egrmont, Henllan Amgoed, Llanboidy, Llandissilio East, Llanfalteg East, Llangan East, Llanglydwen, Marros, Pendine.	Remainder of PLU in Pembrokeshire.
Newcastle in Emlyn PLU	Cenarth, Cilrhedyn (Carmarthenshire portion), Llanfihangel-Ar-Arth, Llangeler, Penboyr.	Remainder of PLU in Cardiganshire & Pembrokeshire.

== Denbighshire ==
Link to 1888 map showing Denbighshire PLUs; Link to 1909 map showing Denbighshire PLUs; Link to 1924 map showing Denbighshire PLUs

Name	Civil Parishes	Notes
Conway PLU	Llandrillo-yn-Rhôs, Llanelian-yn-Rhôs, Llansantffraid Glan Conway.	Remainder of PLU in Caernarvonshire.
Corwen PLU	Bryn Eglwys, Cerrigy Druidion, Glyn Traian, Llanarmon Dyffryn Ceiriog, Llanfihangel Glyn Myfyr, Llangollen Traian, Llangwm, Llansantffraid Glyn Ceiriog, Llantysilio.	Remainder of PLU in Merionethshire.
Holywell PLU	Nannerch (Denbighshire portion).	Remainder of PLU in Flintshire.
Llanfyllin PLU	Llanarmon Mynydd Mawr, Llangadwaladr, Llangedwyn, Llanrhaiadr Ym Mochnant.	Remainder of PLU in Montgomeryshire.
Llanrwst PLU	Eglwys-Fach, Gwerni Howel, Gwytherin, Llanddoget, Llangerniew, Llanrwst + detached portion, Pentre Voelas, Tir Ifan, Tre Brys.	Remainder of PLU in Caernarvonshire.
Oswestry PLU	Chirk, Llansilin.	Remainder of PLU in Shropshire, England.
Ruthin PLU	Aberchwiler, Clocaenog, Cyffylliog, Derwen, Efenechtyd, Llanarmon (Denbighshire portion), Llanbedr Dyffryn Clwyd, Llandegla, Llandyrnog + detached portion, Llanelidan, Llanfair Dyffryn Clwyd, Llanferres, Llanfwrog + detached portion, Llangwyfan, Llangynhafal, Llanrhaiadr Yn Cinmerch, Llanrhydd, Llanychan, Llanynys, Nantglyn, Ruthin.	Remainder of PLU in Flintshire.
St Asaph PLU	Abergele, Bettws-yn-Rhôs or Bettws-Abergele, Denbigh, Henllan, Llanddulas + detached portion, Llanfair Talhaiarn, Llannefydd, Llansannan, St Asaph (Denbighshire portion), St George.	Remainder of PLU in Flintshire.
Wrexham PLU	Abenbury Fawr, Acton, Allington, Bieston, Borras Hovan, Borras Riffre, Broughton, Brymbo, Burton, Cacca Dutton + 2 detached portions, Dutton Diffeth + detached portion, Dutton Y Bran, Erbistock (Denbighshire portion), Erlas, Erthic, Esclusham Above, Esclusham Below, Eyton, Gourton, Gresford, Gwersyllt, Holt, Llai, Marchwiel, Minera, Pickhill, Ridley, Royton, Ruabon, Sesswick, Stansty, Sutton, Wrexham Regis.	Remainder of PLU in Flintshire, Wales & Cheshire, England.

== Flintshire ==
Link to 1888 map showing Flintshire PLUs; Link to 1909 map showing Flintshire PLUs; Link to 1924 map showing Flintshire PLUs

Name	Civil Parishes	Notes
Ellesmere PLU	Bettisfield, Bronington, Halghton, Hanmer, Overton, Penley, Tybroughton, Willington.	Remainder of PLU in Shropshire, England.
Hawarden PLU	Hawarden + detached portion, Higher Kinnerton, Hope, Mafford & Hoseley, Saltney, Tryddyn.	
Holywell PLU	Caerwys, Cilcain, Flint, Halkin, Holywell, Llanasa, Mold, Nannerch (Flintshire portion), Nerquis, Newmarket, Northop, Swaenysgor, Whitford, Ysceifiog.	Remainder of PLU in Denbighshire.
Ruthin PLU	Llanarmon (Flintshire portion).	Remainder of PLU in Denbighshire.
St Asaph PLU	Bodfari, Cwm, Dyserth, Meliden, Rhuddlan, St Asaph (Flintshire portion), Tremeirchion.	Remainder of PLU in Denbighshire.
Whitchurch PLU	Is Coyd.	Remainder of PLU in Cheshire & Shropshire, England.
Wrexham PLU	Bangor, Erbistock (Flintshire portion), Threapwood (Flintshire portion), Worthenbury.	Remainder of PLU in Denbighshire, Wales & Cheshire, England.

== Glamorganshire ==
Link to 1888 map showing Glamorganshire PLUs; Link to 1908 map showing Glamorganshire PLUs; Link to 1924 map showing Glamorganshire PLUs

Name	Civil Parishes	Notes
Bridgend & Cowbridge PLU	Bettws, Coity Higher, Coity Lower, Colwinston, Cowbridge, Coychurch Higher, Coychurch Lower, Cwmdu, Eglwys Brewis, Ewenny, Flemingston, Gileston, Kenfig, Laleston, Llanbleiddian, Llandough juxta Cowbride, Llandow, Llandyfodwg, Llanfihangel, Llan-Gan, Llangeinwyr, Llangynwyd Higher, Llangynwyd Lower, Llangynwyd Middle, Llanharan, Llanhary, Llanilid, Llanmaes, Llansannwr, Llantwit-Major, Llysworney, Marcross, Merthyr-Mawr, Monknash, Nash, Newcastle Higher, Newcastle Lower, Newton-Nottage, Pencoed, Pen-llîn, Peterston super Montem, Pyle, Sker, St Andrews Minor, St Athan, St Brides Major, St Brides Minor, St Donat, St Hilary, St Mary Church, St Mary Hill, Stembridge, Tythegston Higher, Tythegston Lower, Wick, Ynysawdre, Ystradowain.	
Cardiff PLU	Barry, Bonvilston, Cadoxton juxta Barry, Caerau, Canton, Cogan, Highlight, Lanishen, Lavernock, Leckwith, Lisvane, Llancarfan, Llandaff, Llandough juxta Cardiff, Llanedeyrn, Llanilltern, Llantrithyd, Llanvithyn, Merthyr Dovan, Michaelston, Michaelston super Ely, Penarth, Pendoylan, Penmark, Pentyrch, Peterston super Ely, Porthkerry + detached portion, Radyr, Roath, Rudry, Sheeping Moors common to St Andrews Major and Cadoxton juxta Barry, St Andrews Major, St Brides super Ely, St Fagans, St Georges, St John Cardiff, St Lythans, St Mary Cardiff + detached island, St Nicholas, Sully + 2 detached islands, Van, Welsh St Donats, Wenvoe, Whitchurch.	Remainder of PLU in Monmouthshire.
Gower PLU	Bishopston, Cheriton, Ilston, Knelston, Llanddewi, Llangenydd, Llanmadog, Llanrhidian Higher, Llanrhidian Lower, Nicholaston, Oxwich, Oystermouth, Penard, Penmaen, Penrice, Port-Eynon, Reynoldston, Rhossili.	
Llanelli PLU	Loughor, Loughor Borough.	Remainder of PLU in Carmarthenshire.
Merthyr-Tydfil PLU	Aberdare, Gelligaer + detached portion, Merthyr-Tydfil, Rhigos.	Remainder of PLU in Breconshire.
Neath PLU	Aberafon, Baglan Higher + detached portion, Baglan Lower, Blaengwrach, Blaen-Honddan, Briton Ferry, Clyne, Coed-Ffranc, Dulais Higher, Dulais Lower, Dyffryn Clydach, Glyncorrwg, Margam, Michaelston Higher, Michaelston Lower, Neath, Neath Higher, Neath Lower, Neath Middle, Resolven.	Remainder of PLU in Breconshire.
Newport PLU	Llanvedw, Rhydgwern.	Remainder of PLU in Monmouthshire.
Pontardawe PLU	Cîl-y-Bebyll, Llangiwg, Mawr, Rhwngdwy Clydach, Ynys-y-Mond.	Remainder of PLU in Breconshire.
Pontypridd PLU	Eglwysilan, Llanfabon, Llantrisant, Llantwit Fardre, Llanwonno, Ystrad-Dyfodwg.	
Swansea PLU	Clase, Llandeilo-Talybont, Llansamlet Higher + detached portion, Llansamlet Lower, Penderi, St John Swansea, St Thomas Swansea, Swansea Higher & Lower, Swansea Town & Franchise.	

== Merionethshire ==
Link to 1888 map showing Merionethshire PLUs; Link to 1909 map showing Merionethshire PLUs; Link to 1924 map showing Merionethshire PLUs

Name	Civil Parishes	Notes
Bala PLU	Llandderfel, Llanfor, Llangower, Llanuwchllyn, Llanycil.	
Corwen PLU	Bettws-Gwerfil Goch, Corwen, Gwyddelwern, Llandrillo, Llangar, Llansantffraid Glyn Dyfrdwy.	Remainder of PLU in Denbighshire.
Dolgellau PLU	Dolgelley, Llanaber, Llanddwywe-Iŝ-y-Graig, Llanddwywe-Uwch-y-Graig, Llanegryn, Llanelltyd, Llanenddwyn + detached portion, Llanfachreth, Llanfihangel-y-Pennant, Llangelynin, Llanymawddwy, Mallwyd (Merionethshire portion), Tal-y-Llyn.	Remainder of PLU in Montgomeryshire.
Ffestiniog PLU	Beddgelert (Merionethshire portion), Ffestiniog, Llanbedr + detached portion, Llandanwg, Llandecwyn, Llanfair, Llanfihangel-y-Traethau, Llanfrothen, Maentwrog, Trawsfynydd.	Remainder of PLU in Caernarvonshire.
Machynlleth PLU	Pennal, Towyn.	Remainder of PLU in Cardiganshire & Montgomeryshire.

== Monmouthshire ==
Link to 1888 map showing Monmouthshire PLUs; Link to 1909 map showing Monmouthshire PLUs; Link to 1925 map showing Monmouthshire PLUs

Name	Civil Parishes	Notes
Abergavenny PLU	Abergavenny, Bettws Newydd, Bwlch-Trewyn, Clytha, Llanarth Bryngwyn, Llanelen, Llanfoist + detached portion, Llangattock Lingoed, Llangattock nigh Usk, Llanover, Llansaintfraed, Llanthewy-Rytherch, Llanthewy-Skirrid, Llantilio-Pertholey + detached portion, Llanvair-Kilgidin, Llanvapley, Llanvetherine, Llanvihangel nigh Usk, Llanvihangel-Crucorney, Llanwenarth Citra, Llanwenarth Ultra, Lower Cwmyoy, Oldcastle, Upper Cwmyoy.	Remainder of PLU in Herefordshire, England.
Bedwelty PLU	Aberystruth, Bedwellty.	
Cardiff PLU	Rumney, St Mellons.	Remainder of PLU in Glamorganshire.
Chepstow PLU	Caerwent, Caldicot, Chapel Hill, Chepstow, Dinham, Howick, Ifton, Itton, Kilgwrrwg, Llangwm Isaf, Llangwm Uchaf, Llansoy, Llanvair-Discoed, Llanvihangel near Roggiett, Llanvihangel Tor-y-Mynydd, Mathern & St Pierre, Mounton, Newchurch East, Newchurch West, Penterry, Portskewet, Roggiett, Shire-Newton, St Arvans, St Arvans Grange, St Bride’s Netherwent, St Kingsmark, Tintern Parva, Trelleck Grange, Undy.	Remainder of PLU in Gloucestershire, England.
Dore PLU	Grosmont, Llangua.	Remainder of PLU in Herefordshire, England.
Monmouth PLU	Cwmcarvan, Dingestow, Dixton Newton, Llandenny, Llandogo, Llangattock-Vibon-Avel, Llangoven, Llanishen, Llantilio Crossenny, Llanvihangel-Ystern-Llewern, Mitchel Troy, Monmouth, Parc Grace Dieu, Penallt, Penrhôs, Pen-y-Clawdd, Raglan, Rockfield, Skenfreth, St Maughans, Tregare, Trelleck, Trelleck Town, Wonaston.	Remainder of PLU in Gloucestershire & Herefordshire, England.
Newport PLU	Bedwas, Bettws, Bishton, Caerleon, Christchurch, Coedcernew, Duffryn, Goldcliff, Graig, Henllys, Kemeys Inferior, Llandevenny, Llangattock juxta Caerleon, Llangstone, Llanhennock + detached portion, Llanmartin, Llanvaches, Llanvihangel Llantarnam, Llanwern, Machen Lower, Machen Upper, Magor, Malpas, Marshfield, Michaelston Fedwy, Mynyddislwyn, Nash, Newport, Penhow, Peterstone Wentlloog, Redwick, Risca, Rogerstone, St Brides Wentlloog, St Woollos, Tredunnock, Whitson, Wilcrick.	Remainder of PLU in Glamorganshire.
Pontypool PLU	Glascoed, Goytre, Gwehellog, Gwernesney, Kemeys Commander, Llanbadock, Llanddewi-Fâch, Llandegveth, Llanfrechfa Lower, Llanfrechfa Upper + detached portion, Llangeview, Llangibby, Llanhilleth, Llanllowel, Llantrissent, Llanvihangel-Pontymoil, Mamhilad, Monkswood, Panteg, Trevethin, Trostrey, Usk.	

== Montgomeryshire ==
Link to 1888 map showing Montgomeryshire PLUs; Link to 1910 map showing Montgomeryshire PLUs; Link to 1924 map showing Montgomeryshire PLUs

Name	Civil Parishes	Notes
Atcham PLU	Bausley, Criggion.	Remainder of PLU in Shropshire, England.
Clun PLU	Hyssington, Snead.	Remainder of PLU in Shropshire, England.
Dolgellau PLU	Mallwyd (Montgomeryshire portion).	Remainder of PLU in Merionethshire.
Forden PLU	Aston, Berriew, Castle Caereinion, Castlewright, Churchstoke + detached portion, Cletterwood, Forden, Hope, Leighton, Llandyssil, Llanmerewig, Middletown, Montgomery, Pool Lower + detached portion, Pool Middle, Pool Upper, Rhos-Gôch, Trelystan, Trewern, Uppington.	Remainder of PLU in Shropshire, England.
Llanfyllin PLU	Careghofa, Garthbeibio, Guilsfield, Hirnant, Llandrinio, Llandysilio, Llanerfyl, Llanfair-Caereinion, Llanfechain, Llanfihangel-Yng-Ngwynfa, Llanfyllin, Llangadfan, Llangyniew, Llangynog, Llanrhaiadr-Ym-Mochnant, Llansantffraid Deythur, Llansantffraid Pool, Llanwddyn, Lower Pennant, Meifod.	Remainder of PLU in Denbighshire.
Machynlleth PLU	Cemmaes, Darowen, Isygarreg, Llanbrynmair, Llanwrin, Machynlleth, Penegoes, Uwchygarreg.	Remainder of PLU in Cardiganshire & Merionethshire.
Newtown & Llanidloes PLU	Aberhafesp, Bettws, Carno, Kerry, Llandinam, Llangurig, Llanidloes, Llanllugan, Llanllwchaiarn, Llanwnnog, Llanwyddelan, Manafon, Mochdre, Newtown, Penstrowed, Trefeglwys, Tregynon.	

== Pembrokeshire ==
Link to 1888 map showing Pembrokeshire PLUs; Link to 1910 map showing Pembrokeshire PLUs; Link to 1925 map showing Pembrokeshire PLUs

Name	Civil Parishes	Notes
Cardigan PLU	Bayvil, Bridell, Dinas, Eglwyswrw, Kilgerran, Llanfair-Nant-Gwyn, Llanfihangel-Penbedw, Llantood, Llanychlwydog, Manerdivey, Meline, Monington, Moylgrove, Nevern, Newport, St Dogmells, Whitechurch.	Remainder of PLU in Cardiganshire.
Haverfordwest PLU	Ambleston, Boulston, Brawdy, Camrose, Castlebythe, Dale, Fishguard, Freystrop, Furzy Park & Portfield, Granston, Haroldston St Issels, Haroldston West, Hasguard, Hayscastle, Henry’s Moat, Herbrandston, Hubberston, Johnston, Jordanston, Lambston, Langum, Letterston, Little Newcastle, Llandeloy, Llanfair-Nant-y-Gof, Llanhowel, Llanllawer, Llanreithan + 2 detached portions, Llanrian, Llanstinan, Llanwnda, Llanychaer, Manorowen, Marloes + detached island, Mathry, Morvil, Nolton, Pontfaen, Prendergast, Puncheston, Robeston, Roch, Rudbaxton, Skokholm Island, Spittal, St Brides + detached island, St David’s + 4 detached islands, St Dogwells + detached portion, St Edrens, St Elvis, St Ishmael, St Lawrence, St Martin Haverfordwest + 5 detached islands, St Mary Haverfordwest, St Nicholas, St Thomas Haverfordwest + 2 detached portions, Stack Rock Island, Steynton, Talbenny, The Cathedral Close of St David’s, Trefgarn, Uzmaston, Walton East, Walton West, Walwyns Castle, Whitchurch + detached portion, Wiston.	
Narberth PLU	Amroth, Begelly, Bletherston, Clarbeston, Coedcanlass, Crinow, Crunwear, East Williamston, Grondre, Jeffreston, Lampeter-Velfrey + detached portion, Llanddewi-Velfrey, Llandilo, Llandissilio West, Llanfallteg West, Llangan West, Llangolman, Llanycefn, Llawhaden, Llys-y-Fran, Loveston, Ludchurch, Maenclochog, Martletwy, Minwear, Mounton, Mynachi Og-Ddu, Narberth North, Narberth South, New Moat, Newton North, Reynalton, Robeston Wathen, Slebech, St Issells, Vorlan, Yerbeston.	Remainder of PLU in Carmarthenshire.
Newcastle in Emlyn PLU	Capel Colman, Castellan, Cilrhedyn (Pembrokeshire portion), Clydey, Llanfyrnach, Penrydd.	Remainder of PLU in Cardiganshire & Carmarthenshire.
Pembroke PLU	Angle + detached island, Bosherston, Burton, Caldy Island + detached island, Carew, Castle Martin, Cosheston, Gumfreston, Hodgeston, Lamphey, Lawrenny, Llanstadwell, Manorbier, Monkton, Nash, Penally, Pwllcroghan, Redberth, Rhoscrowther, Rosemarket, St Florence, St Mary in Liberty + detached island, St Mary out Liberty, St Mary Pembroke, St Michael Pembroke, St Petrox, St Twynnell, Stackpole Elidor, Upton, Warren.	

== Radnorshire ==
Link to 1888 map showing Radnorshire PLUs; Link to 1909 map showing Radnorshire PLUs; Link to 1924 map showing Radnorshire PLUs

Name	Civil Parishes	Notes
Builth PLU	Aberedw, Bettws Disserth, Cregrina, Disserth & Trecced, Llanbadarn-y-Garreg, Llandrindod, Llanelwedd, Llanfaredd, Llansantfraid in Elvel, Rhulen.	Remainder of PLU in Breconshire.
Hay PLU	Boughrood, Bryngwyn, Clyro, Glasbury, Llanbedr-Painscastle, Llanddewi-Fâch, Llandeilo-Graban, Llanstephan, Llowes.	Remainder of PLU in Breconshire, Wales & Herefordshire, England.
Kington PLU	Colva, Ednol, Evenjobb, Gladestry, Glascwm, Harpton & Wolfpits, Kinnerton Salford & Badland, Llandegley, Llanfihangel Nant-Melan, Michaelchurch-on-Arrow, New Radnor, Newchurch, Old Radnor & Burlingjobb, Trewern & Gwithla, Walton & Womaston.	Remainder of PLU in Herefordshire, England.
Knighton PLU	Beguildy, Bleddfa, Cascob, Discoed, Heyop, Knighton, Litton & Cascob, Llananno, Llanbadarn-Fynydd, Llanbister, Llanddewi-Ystradenny, Llanfihangel-Rhydithon, Llangynllo, Norton, Pilleth, Presteigne, Stanage, Whitton.	Remainder of PLU in Herefordshire & Shropshire, England.
Rhayader PLU	Abbey-Cwmhîr, Cefnllys, Llanbadarn-Fawr, Llanfihangel Helygen, Llansantffraid-Cwmdeuddwr, Llanyre, Nantmel, Rhayader, St Harmon.	Remainder of PLU in Breconshire.
