= Newport Poor Law Union =

Newport Poor Law Union was a health and social security organisation in Newport, Monmouthshire and surrounding parishes. It was formed on 1 August 1836 under the Poor Law Amendment Act 1834 and was composed of 40 constituent parishes:

In the county of Monmouth:

Bedwas, Bettws, Bishton, Caerleon, Christchurch with hamlet of Caerleon ultra Pontem, Coedkernew, Duffryn, Goldcliff, Graig, Henllys, Kemeys Inferior, Langstone with hamlet of Llanbeder, Llandevenny, Llangattock juxta Caerleon, Llanhennock, Llanmartin with hamlet of Llanbeder, Llanwern, Llanvaches, Llanvihangel Llantarnam, Lower Machen, Upper Machen, Magor, Malpas, Marshfield, Michaelston-y-vedw, Mynyddislwyn, Nash, Newport, Penhow, Peterstone, Redwick, Risca, Rogerstone, St Brides Wentloog, St Woolos, Tredunnock, Whitson and Wilcrick

In the county of Glamorgan: Rhydgwern and Llanvedow

Each parish elected a member to the Board of Guardians, except the parishes of Mynyddislwyn, Newport and St Woolos, which elected two. From 1895 the Monmouthshire parishes of Rumney and St Mellons were added, each electing one member.

The union was abolished in 1930 by the Local Government Act 1929 with the responsibility for the Royal Gwent Hospital being taken over by the county borough of Newport.
