= Magor Rural District =

Former local government area in the UK

Magor
- History
  - Created: 1894
  - Abolished: 1935
  - Succeeded by: Magor and St Mellons rural district
- Status: Rural District
  - HQ: Newport

Magor Rural District is a defunct district council. It was established under the provisions of the Local Government Act 1894 and comprised the parishes of Bishopston, Kemeys, Christchurch, Goldcliff, Langstone, Llandevenny, Llanwern, Llanvaches, Llanfarthin, Llangattock, Llanhennock, Magor, Nash, Penhow, Redwick, Tredunnock, Whitson and Wilcrick in the administrative county of Monmouthshire. The Rural District Council comprised a number of councillors and a chairman and initially replaced the local sanitary authorities. Its responsibilities included sanitary services, sewerage, refuse collection, maintaining local roads, cemeteries and parks, licensing of public entertainments, water supply and housing. The council was administered by a number of committees and by appointed officers including a Clerk, Treasurer, Medical Officer of Health, Surveyor and Sanitary Inspector. Magor Rural District was abolished in 1935 and was mostly absorbed by the new Magor and St Mellons Rural District.
