= The Gaer House =

Coordinates: 51.899000°N 2.910907°W

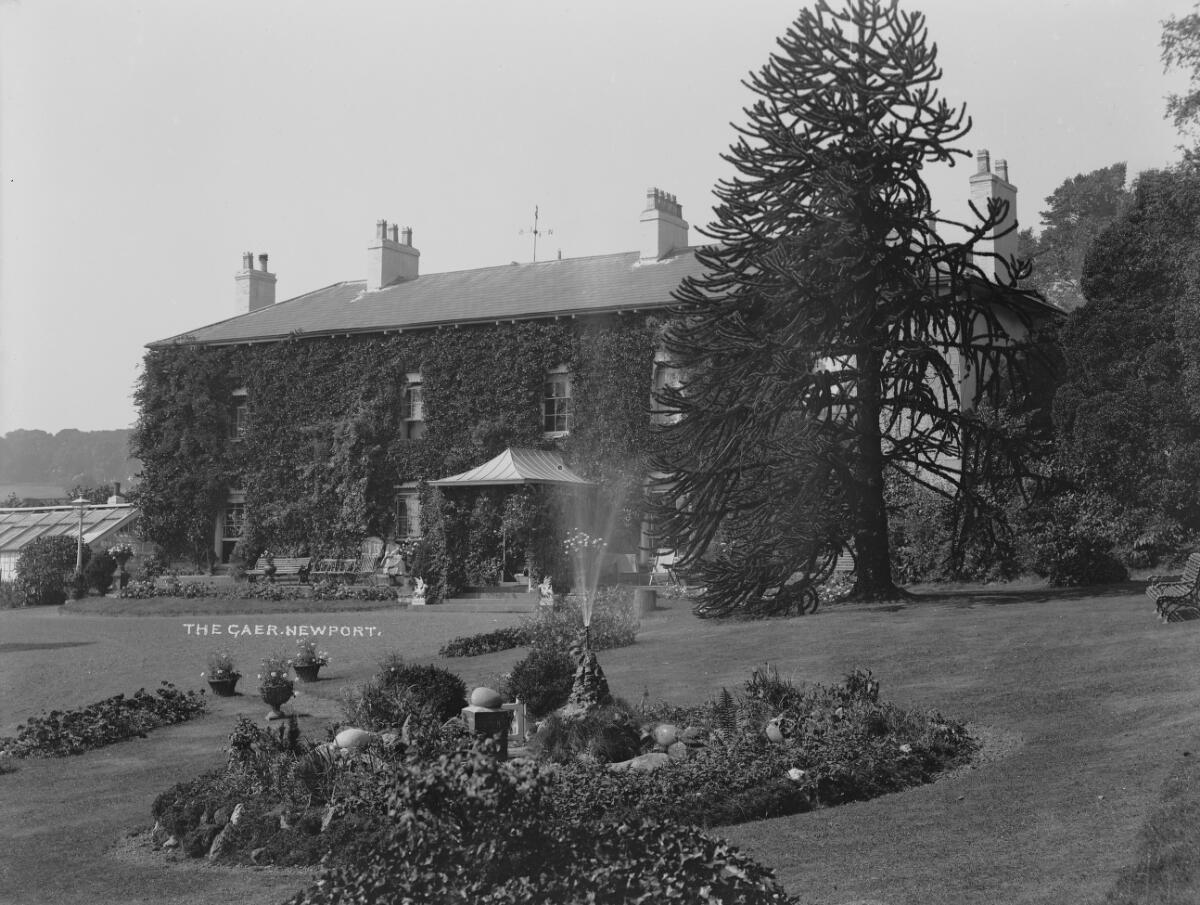
The Gaer, Newport (4641381).jpg

The Gaer House (Welsh: "Yr Ty Gaer" meaning 'The Fort House' or 'The House of the Fort') is an estate house located in the community of Gaer, Newport, South Wales. It is situated about 2 miles (3.2 km) from the Newport to Cardiff road, near a Roman fort, which gave the name to the estate. The Gaer Hillfort (alternative: the Gollars), a large circular site, is a huge fort situated in a defensive position overlooking the Ebbw River. It contains many enclosures, a large bank and a ditch. In the 17th century, the hillfort was included in the ornamental landscaping plan of nearby Tredegar House.

The original Gaer House was built in the reign of Queen Elizabeth by Alexander Seys, Esq., second son of Roger Seys, Esq., of Boverton. Roger Seys was Attorney-general of Wales in the time of Queen Elizabeth. Alexander Seys had several children by his wife Elizabeth: Roger, Alexander, William, Elizabeth, Mary, and Florence. The Gaer House passed to the third son, William. The Gaer remained in the Seys family until the death of William Seys, High Sheriff for the county in 1738. He left four daughters, his coheirs. Florence, his third daughter, married Henry Montonnier Hawkins (d. May 1814), and the house passed to their son, Anthony Montonnier Hawkins in whose lifetime, the Gaer House was entirely renovated, the Elizabethan architecture destroyed, and a modern front substituted without any particular style of architecture. It stands upon a slight topographic prominence, which has views over the Bristol Channel to the coast of Somersetshire. In one area, the grounds extend to Tredegar House Country Park, on the highest portion of which are the remains of the Roman fort or encampment.

By the mid 19th century, it was the home of Thomas Powell, a Magistrate and Deputy-Lieutenant of Monmouthshire, whose colliery was named the Gelly Gaer. Charles D. Phillips (1845–1912) owned the house in the early 20th century. He was apprenticed as a young man to the mechanical engineering profession, and became proprietor of an engineering business. He went on to own the Emlyn Works at Newport, along with works at Gloucester, which and branches in London and Cardiff. He also founded and published Phillips' Monthly Machinery Register, to which he added later an electrical and autocar supplement. He was also a farmer, as well as a manufacturer of and dealer in machinery and engineering plants. Phillips was a member of the Institution of Mechanical Engineers and the South Wales Institute of Engineers. He was elected a member of the Iron and Steel Institute in 1890.
