= Magor and St Mellons Rural District =

Former local government area in the UK

Coordinates: 51.583°N 2.931°W

Magor and St Mellons
- Population
  - 1939: 12,283
  - 1961: 17,720
- History
  - Created: 1935
  - Abolished: 1974
  - Succeeded by: Newport, Cardiff and Torfaen districts
- Status: Rural District
  - HQ: Newport

Magor and St Mellons Rural District was created on 1 April 1935 from Magor Rural District and St Mellons Rural District in the administrative county of Monmouthshire. The district was a mixture of suburban and semi-rural parishes around Newport and had its headquarters in Baneswell, Newport.

It comprised the parishes of Bettws, Bishton, Coedkernew, Duffryn, Goldcliff, Graig, Henllys, Kemeys Inferior, Langstone, Llandevenny, Llanmartin, Llanwern, Llanvaches, Machen Lower, Magor, Marshfield, Michaelstone-y-Fedw, Nash, Penhow, Peterstone Wentloog, Rogerstone, Rumney, St Brides Wentloog, St Mellons, Redwick, Whitson and Wilcrick.

In 1938 the parish of Rumney was removed from the Rural District to become part of the county borough of Cardiff, in the neighbouring county of Glamorgan, although it remained part of Monmouthshire.

The Rural District Council comprised a number of councillors and a chairman. Its responsibilities included sanitary services, sewerage, refuse collection, maintaining local roads, cemeteries and parks, licensing of public entertainments, water supply and housing. The council was administered by a number of committees and by appointed officers including a Clerk, Treasurer, Medical Officer of Health, Surveyor and Sanitary Inspector. The headquarters were in Baneswell, Newport.

Magor and St Mellons Rural District was abolished in 1974, with Henllys becoming part of the Torfaen district (borough) and St Mellons becoming part of the City of Cardiff. The remaining majority of the district became part of the Borough of Newport. The Mayor of Newport's Mayoral Chains of Office carry the medallion of the Magor and St Mellons Rural District to show this historic association.

== See also ==
- Magor Rural District
- St Mellons Rural District
