= St Mellons Rural District =

Local government area in the UK, abolished 1974

Coordinates: 51.5425°N 3.1308°W

St Mellons
- History
  - Created: 1894
  - Abolished: 1935
  - Succeeded by: Magor and St Mellons rural district
- Status: Rural District
  - HQ: Newport

St Mellons Rural District is a defunct district council. It was established under the provisions of the Local Government Act 1894 from part of the existing Newport Rural Sanitary District. It comprised the parishes of Bedwas, Bettws, Coedkernew, Duffryn, Graig, Henllys, Machen Lower, Machen Upper, Malpas, Marshfield, Michaelstone-y-Fedw, Peterstone Wentloog, Rogerstone, Rumney, St Brides Wentloog, St Mellons and St Woolos in the administrative county of Monmouthshire. Initially, the St Mellons Rural District Council also administered two parishes in Glamorgan: Llanvedw and Rhydygwern, which had also formed part of the sanitary district. The Glamorgan parishes were annexed to Llandaff and Dinas Powis Rural District in 1895.

The Rural District Council comprised a number of councillors and a chairman and initially replaced the local sanitary authorities. Its responsibilities included sanitary services, sewerage, refuse collection, maintaining local roads, cemeteries and parks, licensing of public entertainments, water supply and housing. The council was administered by a number of committees and by appointed officers including a Clerk, Treasurer, Medical Officer of Health, Surveyor and Sanitary Inspector.

In 1912 the parishes of Bedwas and Machen Upper were removed from the Rural District to become Bedwas and Machen Urban District. St Mellons RDC was abolished in 1935 and was absorbed by the new Magor and St Mellons Rural District with the exception of St Woolos and parts of Bettws and Malpas which became part of Newport county borough.
