= Tredegar Park, Newport =

Community in Newport, Wales

Tredegar Park
- Location within Newport
- Population: 4,421 (2011 census)
- OS grid reference: ST294852
- Principal area: Newport
- Country: Wales
- Sovereign state: United Kingdom
- Post town: NEWPORT
- Postcode district: NP10 8
- Dialling code: 01633; Maesglas exchange
- Police: Gwent
- Fire: South Wales
- Ambulance: Welsh
- UK Parliament: Newport West and Islwyn
- Senedd Cymru – Welsh Parliament: Newport West
- List of places UK Wales Newport 51.56124°N 3.01985°W Map of the community

Tredegar Park (Welsh: Parc Tredegyr) is a community (civil parish) of the city of Newport. It is named after the nearby park, although the community covers a much smaller area.

== Description ==
The community is bounded by the Ebbw River to the northeast, the Great Western Main Line to the east, Pencarn Lane to the south, and the grounds of Tredegar House to the northwest. It consists of the 1970s Duffryn estate and immediate surroundings. Many new private housing estates have been built around Duffryn.

== Governance ==
Until 2022 Tredegar Park was the name of the electoral ward coterminous with the community, surrounded by the Marshfield ward to the south, west and east. The ward elected one city councillor to Newport City Council. Following an electoral boundary review, the ward was merged with Marshfield, to become Tredegar Park and Marshfield. Three councillors were elected at the May 2022 election.
