= Maesglas =

Area of Newport in South Wales

Coordinates: 51.569°N 3.016°W

Maesglas or Maes-glas is a neighbourhood in the south west of the city of Newport, South Wales. In the 16th century it was recorded as Greenfield but the Welsh language name Maesglas has remained the more widely used, among English speakers.

It lies in the Gaer ward directly north of the A48 Southern Distributor Road, south of Cardiff Road and south-west of the South Wales Main Line railway.

The Newport-born author Leslie Thomas wrote of Maesglas:

Maesglas was a penniless place everybody called Moscow. When it was built in the thirties the winter was of such Soviet severity that the frost-bound workmen gave it the name. Poor though it was, nobody who ever lived there can today mention its name or its Russian nickname without breaking into a grin.

This quote is incorporated into a mural telling the history of the estate, painted on the side of the Maesglas shops.

== Housing ==
The main housing estate was first built in the 1930s, then many newer houses were added between the 1970s and 1990s in the Bideford Road area, next to the Great Western Main Line. Homes on the Maesglas estate are fairly compact but all have front and back gardens. Most of the houses are terraced but are arranged in all sorts of different rows and shapes of street, due to being built in the suburbs and having more room to build wider roads. A significant percentage of the houses are council-owned.

In the centre of the estate, there are two schools: Maesglas primary school and Maes-Ebbw School for older students with severe learning difficulties. The nearest Highschools in the area are St. Josephs (Roman Catholic) and Duffryn High School which is attended by most teenagers of the estate.

Semi-detached houses either side of Cardiff Road, St. Bride's Gardens next to the Ebbw River and the small estate (St David's Crescent) next to St. David's R.C. primary school, are also sometimes considered to be part of Maesglas.

== Facilities ==
Maesglas is surrounded by several retail parks including the Harlech Retail Park, Maesglas Retail Park and 28 East Retail Park. Maesglas was also home to the headquarters of the Monmouthshire region's local newspaper, the South Wales Argus, until 2020. South-east of the railway line lies the Maesglas Industrial Estate, although this is in the Pill ward.

Both the Maesglas estate and the nearby Gaer estate are Communities First areas of Newport, recognised as being high on the index of multiple deprivation used by the Welsh Assembly to establish the poverty of an area. Maesglas has benefited hugely since the beginning of the scheme.

Maesglas has many recreational areas nearby such as Tredegar Park as well as football field in the grounds of the Maesglas Primary school. Of historic interest is the site of a former castle.

In 2008, a new suburban railway station was to be built to serve Maesglas. The plan was still being discussed as at 2024.

== Politics ==
The estate is the sub-ward of the Gaer ward of Newport City Council, which elects three councillors for a four-year term. Maesglas is within the Newport West and Islwyn UK Parliamentary constituency and the Newport West Senedd constituency. The current MS is Jayne Bryant and the current MP is Ruth Jones.
