= Gaer, Newport =

Gaer
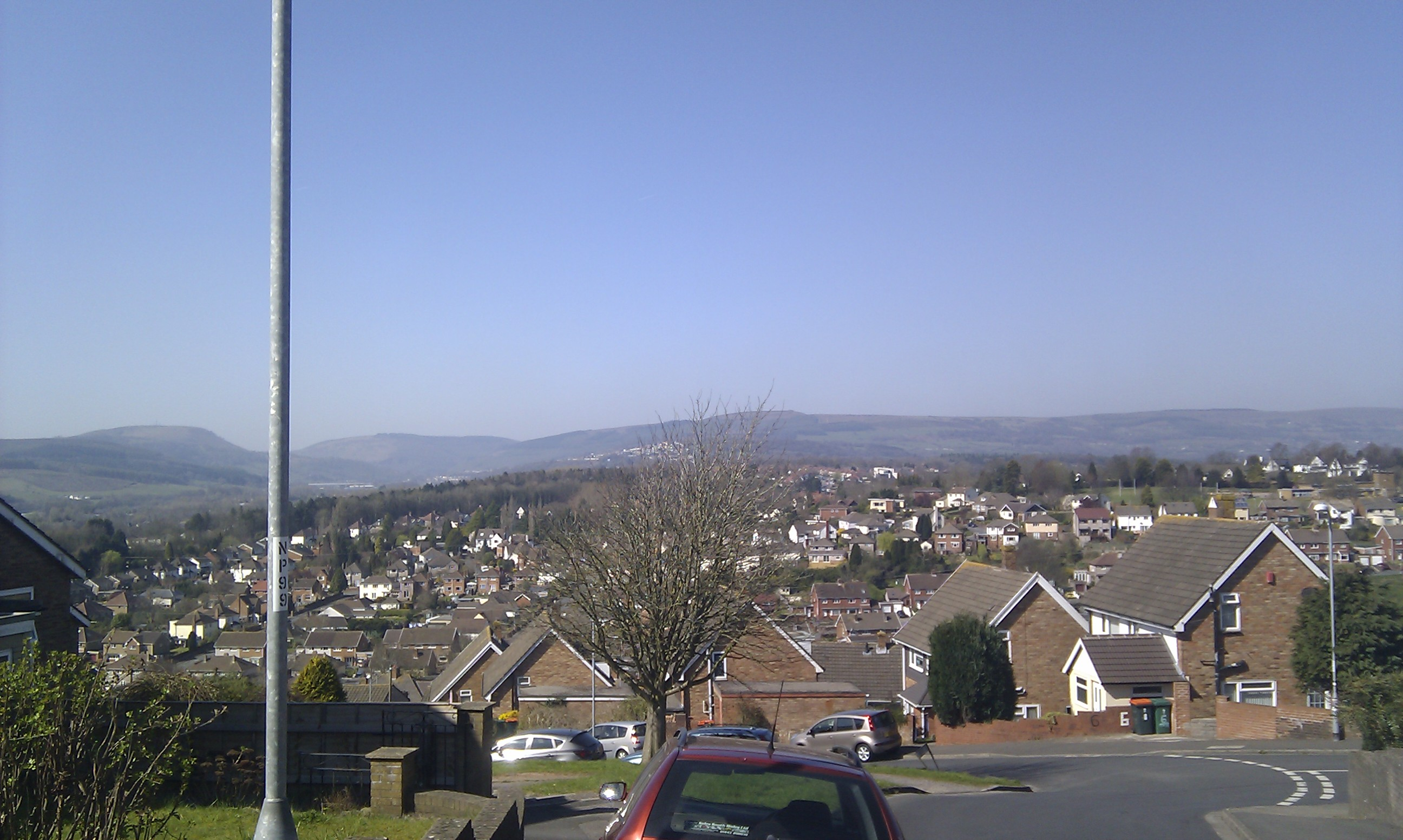
- Looking north towards Twmbarlwm

- Location within Newport
- Population: 8,721 (2011 census)
- OS grid reference: ST295865
- Principal area: Newport
- Country: Wales
- Sovereign state: United Kingdom
- Post town: NEWPORT
- Postcode district: NP20 3
- Dialling code: 01633; Maesglas exchange
- Police: Gwent
- Fire: South Wales
- Ambulance: Welsh
- UK Parliament: Newport West and Islwyn
- Senedd Cymru – Welsh Parliament: Newport West
- List of places UK Wales Newport 51.57294°N 3.01867°W Map of the community

Gaer (Welsh: Y Gaer) is a community and electoral district ("ward") of the city of Newport, South Wales.

The ward includes both the Gaer and Maesglas estates but does not include Ebbw Bridge. To the south west of the ward is a listed monument known as the Gaer Hillfort (alternative: the Gollars) a large ancient hill fort and defensive position overlooking the Ebbw River with views south across the River Severn to England and north towards Twmbarlwm and Mynydd Machen. It is believed to date to the Iron Age. The original Gaer House in the area was built in the reign of Queen Elizabeth by Alexander Seys, Esq., second son of Roger Seys, Esq., of Boverton.

The ward is bounded by Bassaleg Road to the north, the Great Western main line to the east, the Ebbw River to the southeast, Cardiff Road to the southwest, and the M4 motorway to the west.

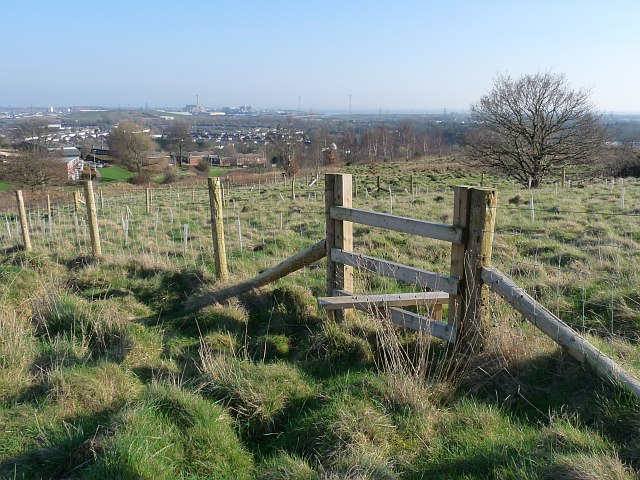
Gaer Hillfort
