= Tredegar Park and Marshfield =

Electoral division in Newport, Wales

Coordinates: 51.542°N 3.046°W

Tredegar Park and Marshfield is an electoral ward for Newport City Council in south Wales. It was created in 2022 by combining the former wards of Tredegar Park and Marshfield. It is represented by three city councillors.

== Description ==
The Tredegar Park and Marshfield ward covers the communities (civil parishes) of Tredegar Park and Marshfield, additionally the communities of Coedkernew, Michaelstone-y-Fedw and Wentlooge, the latter comprising the former ward of Marshfield.

The ward was formed by the merger of the former Marshfield and Tredegar Park wards, following recommendations of an electoral boundary review by the Local Government Boundary Commission for Wales. The review was designed to improve electoral parity, towards an average electorate per councillor of 2,146. The Tredegar Park ward had been 54% under-represented, while the new merged ward with three councillors would be only 25% under-represented. The change took effect from the May 2022 local elections.

== May 2022 election ==
The two Conservative councillors for Marshfield didn't stand for re-election in 2022, though the Labour councillor for Tredegar Park, Trevor Watkins, was hoping to be re-elected. The Green Party were standing a candidate and both of the Propel candidates at this election were standing in Tredegar Park and Marshfield. Propel candidate, Shane Williams, caught attention by registering his home address to an apartment in Dubai. Williams admitted he wouldn't be returning to Newport until two months after the election, though he had been brought up in the area.

All three seats were won by Labour.

Newport City Council election, 5 May 2022
| Party | Candidate | Votes | % |
|---|---|---|---|
| Labour | Rhian Howells | 1,148 | |
| Labour | Allan Screen | 993 | |
| Labour | Trevor Watkins | 917 | |
| Conservative | Sarah Nurse | 855 | |
| Conservative | Wayne Cresswell | 846 | |
| Conservative | Brian Miles | 846 | |
| Green | Catherine Linstrum | 440 | |
| Propel | Celia Jones | 156 | |
| Propel | Shane Williams | 125 | |
| Turnout | | | 28.5 |
