= Church of St Thomas, Redwick =

Coordinates: 51.5530°N 2.8493°W

- Church of St Thomas the Apostle
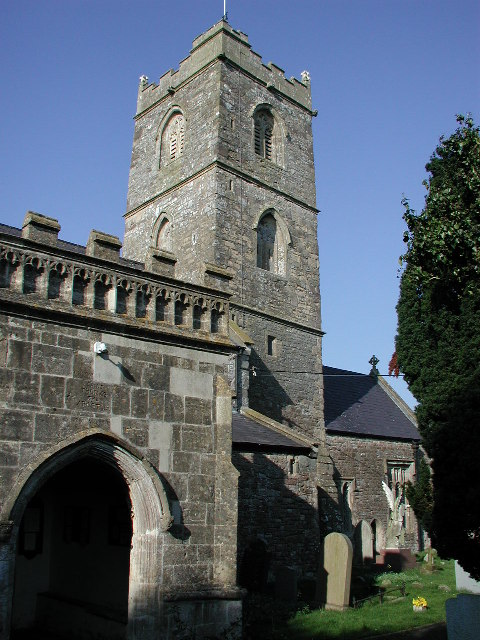
- Entrance porch and tower of St Thomas'
- Church of St Thomas, Redwick
- Location: Redwick
- Country: Wales
- Denomination: Church in Wales

History
- Status: Active
- Dedication: St Thomas

Architecture
- Functional status: Parish church
- Heritage designation: Grade I
- Designated: 3 January 1963

Administration
- Diocese: Monmouth
- Parish: Rectorial Benefice of Magor

The Church of St Thomas is the parish church of the village of Redwick, to the south east of the city of Newport, South Wales, Great Britain. A medieval church, Perpendicular in style, and with elements dating from the fourteenth and fifteenth centuries, possibly with twelfth-century origins, it was listed Grade I on 3 January 1963.

== History and description ==
The church has an "unusual plan", with a central tower standing between the chancel and the nave. In common with many churches on the Gwent Levels, the church suffered during the Great Flood of 1606/7, and a mark on the wall of the porch records the height reached by the water during the flood.

Extensive restoration was carried out by James Norton in 1874–5.

== Sources ==
Newman, John (2002). The Buildings of Wales: Gwent/Monmouthshire. New Haven: Yale University Press. ISBN 978-0-300-09630-9.
