= Stable Block, Tredegar House =

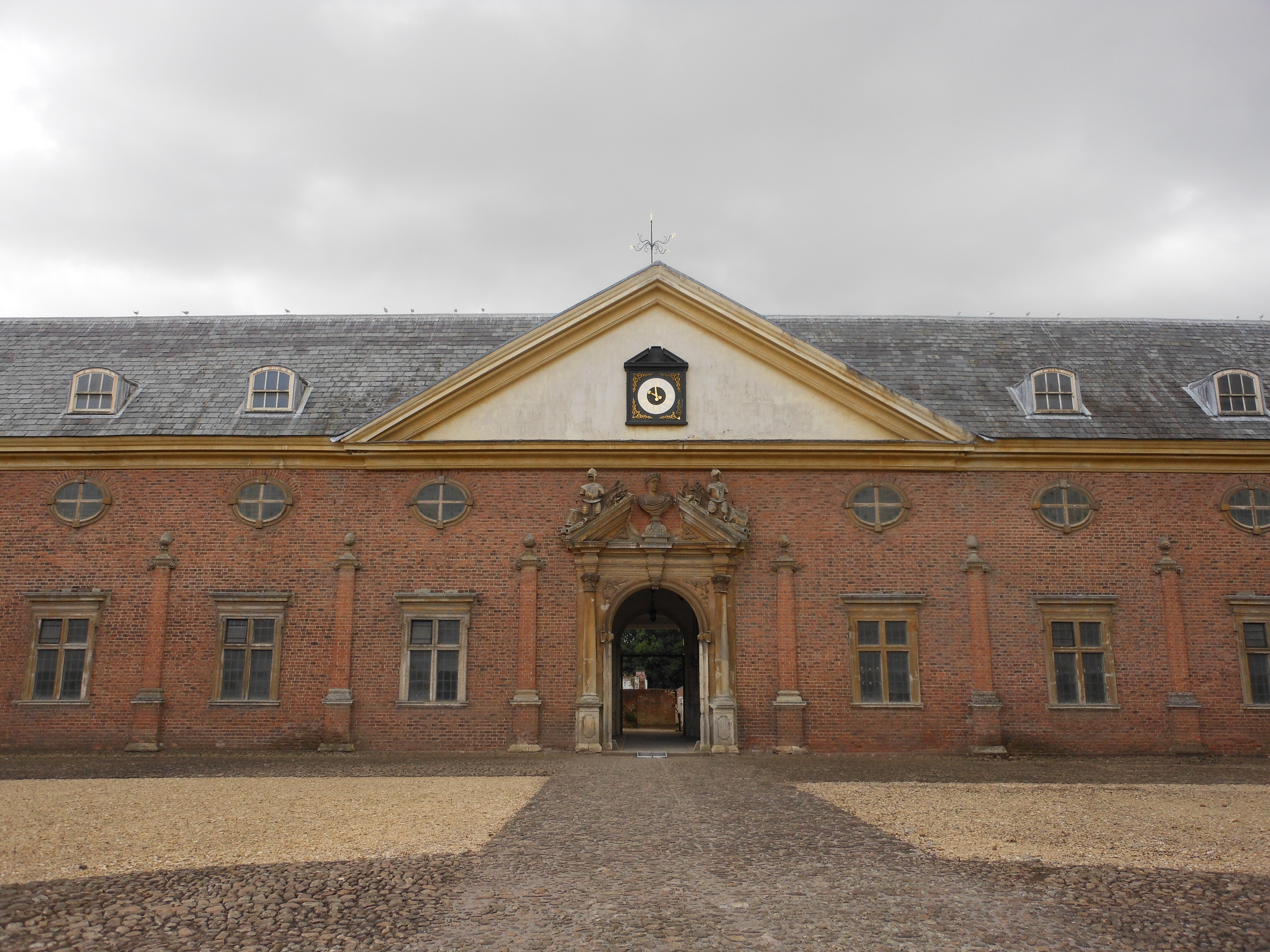
- Stable Block to Tredegar House
- Interactive map of Stable Block, Tredegar House
- Type: Building
- Location: Newport, Monmouthshire, Wales, United Kingdom
- Coordinates: 51°33′41.66″N 3°1′45″W
- Built for: Thomas Morgan (of Dderw)
- Architectural style: Carolean
- Governing body: National Trust
- Website: National Trust: Tredegar House

Listed Building – Grade I
- Designated: 3 January 1963
- Reference no.: 2910

The Stable Block at Tredegar House forms part of the complex of buildings at Tredegar House, at Coedkernew, on the western edge of the city of Newport, Wales. The Stables were built by Thomas Morgan, son of William Morgan (of Machen and Tredegar), who had rebuilt the main house as a "grand(.), classical house" between 1664 and 1672. Newman describes the stables as "match(ing) the house in scale and splendor" and the Stable Block, and attached orangery, were listed Grade I on 3 January 1963. and have been in the care of the National Trust since March 2012.

== History and description ==
The stables were built in 1684–1688 in a Carolean style which followed that used in the rebuilding of the main house. On a grand scale, the building comprises eleven bays and is constructed of red brick, with Bath stone dressings. The architect of the block is not known for certain but Newman follows Howard Colvin in suggesting the brothers, Roger and William Hurlbutt, who had worked in a similar style at Ragley Hall and Warwick Castle. The central carriage arch is framed by Corinthian columns and topped by a pediment with a clock dated 1766. The left hand block contains stabling while the right is empty and may have been used as a riding school.
