= District of Cardiff =

Former district of South Glamorgan, Wales

Coordinates: 51.481°N 3.180°W

Cardiff district Welsh: Caerdydd
- Population
  - 1974: 280,570
  - 1991: 272,557
- History
  - Created: 1974
  - Abolished: 1996
  - Succeeded by: City and County of Cardiff
- Status: City
  - HQ: Cardiff City Hall

The Cardiff district (Welsh: Caerdydd) was one of the two local government districts of South Glamorgan in Wales from 1974 to 1996.

The district comprised the area of the former county borough of Cardiff and several surrounding parishes. Letters patent continuing the city status of the county borough were granted on 1 April 1974. The district was therefore styled the City of Cardiff, governed by Cardiff City Council.

The district was formed by the Local Government Act 1972, from the county borough of Cardiff, the parishes of Lisvane, Llanedeyrn, Radyr, St. Fagans and Tongwynlais from the former Cardiff Rural district in the administrative county of Glamorgan and the parish of St Mellons from the Magor and St Mellons Rural District in the administrative county of Monmouthshire.

The district was abolished in 1996 by the Local Government (Wales) Act 1994, when it was reconstituted, with the addition of Pentyrch, as the City and County of Cardiff.
