= St Andrew's Church, Tredunnock =

Coordinates: 51.6491°N 2.8977°W

Church of St Andrew, Tredunnock
- Church of St Andrew
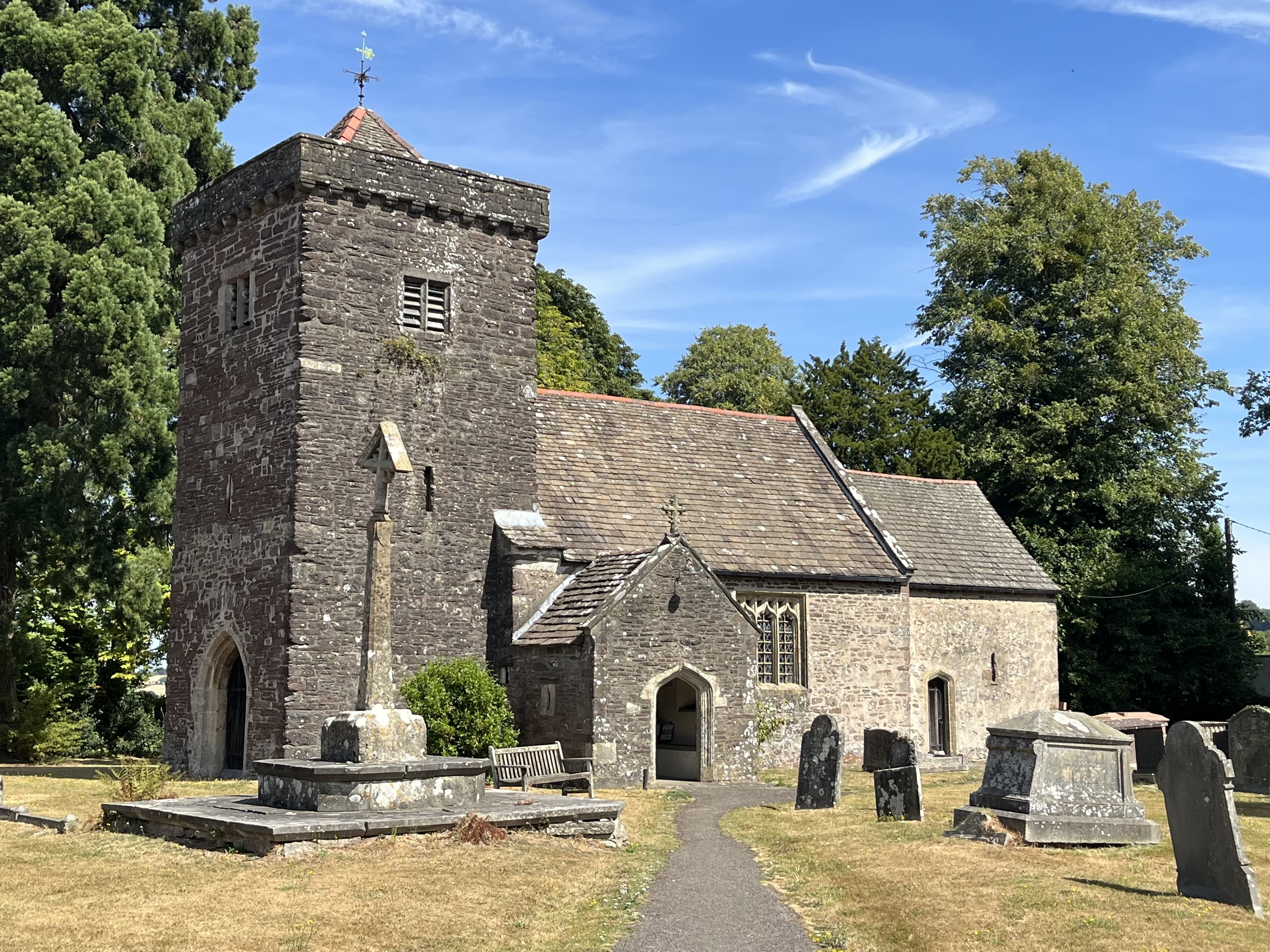
- "a very attractive and well preserved medieval church"

- Location in Monmouthshire
- Location: Tredunnock, Monmouthshire
- Country: Wales
- Denomination: Church in Wales

History
- Status: Parish church
- Founded: C12th-C13th century

Architecture
- Functional status: Active
- Heritage designation: Grade II*
- Designated: 18 November 1980
- Architectural type: Church
- Style: Perpendicular

Administration
- Diocese: Monmouth
- Archdeaconry: Monmouth
- Deanery: Raglan/Usk
- Parish: Heart of Monmouthshire Ministry Area

Clergy
- Rector: Rev’d Canon Sally Ingle-Gillis

The Church of St Andrew, Tredunnock, Monmouthshire is a parish church with its origins in the 12th or 13th century. A Grade II* listed building, the church remains an active parish church.

== History ==
Two lancet windows in the chancel may be Norman, giving a foundation in the 12th century but the earliest recorded mention of the church is from the mid-13th century. Most of the current structure dates from the 15th or 16th centuries, including the porch. The font and the top of the tower are 17th century.

An extensive restoration of the church took place in the early 20th century. The architect was Arthur Grove and a Portland stone tablet by Eric Gill, dated 1910, records the restoration. The Monmouthshire author and artist Fred Hando recorded that the churchyard held the grave of Eleanor Isabella Gill, only child of Sir John Franklin, the Arctic explorer.

== Architecture and description ==
The church is constructed of Old Red Sandstone and the style is Perpendicular. The interior contains a Roman grave-slab, described by the architectural historian John Newman as, "splendidly lettered and well-preserved". It commemorates Julius Julianus, a soldier with the Second Augustan Legion based at Isca Augusta, now Caerleon. The porch contains an early tablet by Eric Gill. In his Journeys in Gwent, published in 1951, Hando recalled that, "For half a millennium the country-folk of Tredunnock have worshipped in their lovely brown church". St Andrew's is a Grade II* listed building, its listing recording it as "a very attractive and well preserved medieval church".
