= Roger Seys =

Roger Seys (died 1599) was a Bencher of Lincoln’s Inn, Attorney general of all Wales, and Under-Sheriff of Glamorganshire in 1570.

He was grandfather of Ievan Sais of Cowbridge. His seat became Boverton through his marriage to Elizabeth, heiress of Griffith Voss, and Maid of Honour to Queen Elizabeth. They had two sons, Richard Seys, of Boverton and Swansea, and Alexander Seys of The Gaer House and Caerleon (or Caerlleon); as well as a daughter, Elizabeth.

He died in 1599, and was buried at Llantwit Major.
