= Monmouth Poor Law Union =

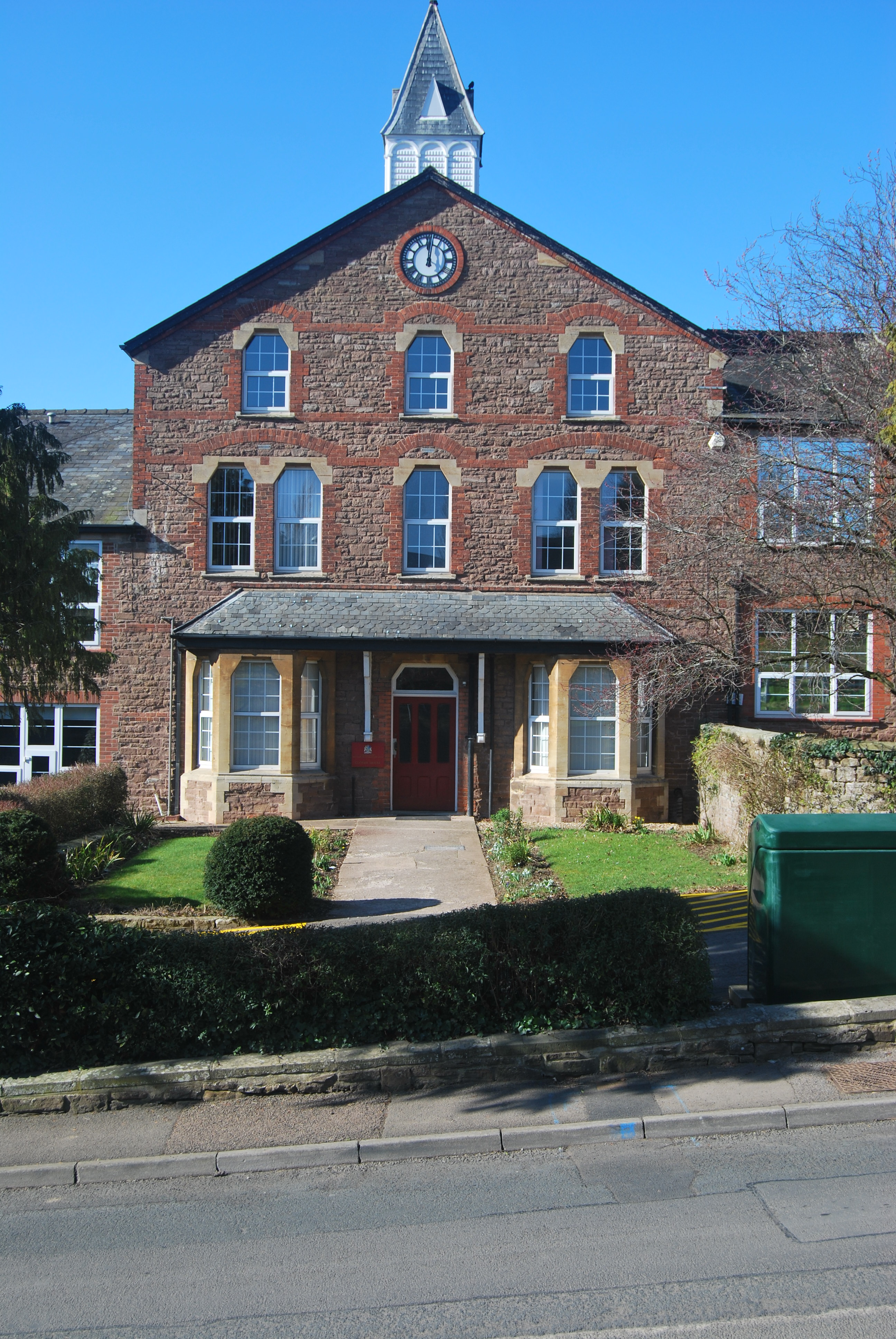
- Predecessor: Monmouth Workhouse
- Formation: 11 July 1836
- Legal status: Defunct
- Location: Monmouth, Wales
- Coordinates: 51.8188°N 2.7130°W
- Region served: Parts of Monmouthshire and Gloucestershire, England

Monmouth Poor Law Union was formed on 11 July 1836 in Monmouth, Wales

== First workhouse ==
In 1835, Monmouth Workhouse, a parish workhouse, was located in Weirhead Street. The building was later demolished.

== Poor Union ==
The Monmouth Poor Union served various parishes of Monmouthshire and Gloucestershire. They were:

- Crick
- Cwmcarvan
- Dingestow
- Dixton with Dixton Hadnock and Dixton Newton
- English Bicknor
- Ganarew
- Llandenny
- Llandogo
- Llangattock-Vibon-Avel
- Llangoven
- Llanishen
- Llanrothal
- Llantilio Crossenny
- Llanvihangel-Ystern-Llewern
- Mitchel Troy
- Monmouth
- Newland
- Parc Grace Dieu
- Penallt
- Penrhos
- Pen-y-clawdd
- Raglan
- Rockfield
- St. Maughans
- Skenfrith
- Staunton
- Tregare
- Trelleck
- Welsh Bicknor
- Welsh Newton
- Whitchurch
- Wonastow, County of Gloucester English Bicknor
- West Dean
- Newland

The Monmouth Union took over the existing Monmouth Parish workhouse at Weirhead Street in 1837.

== 1870 Buildings & Site ==
Monmouth Union Workhouse
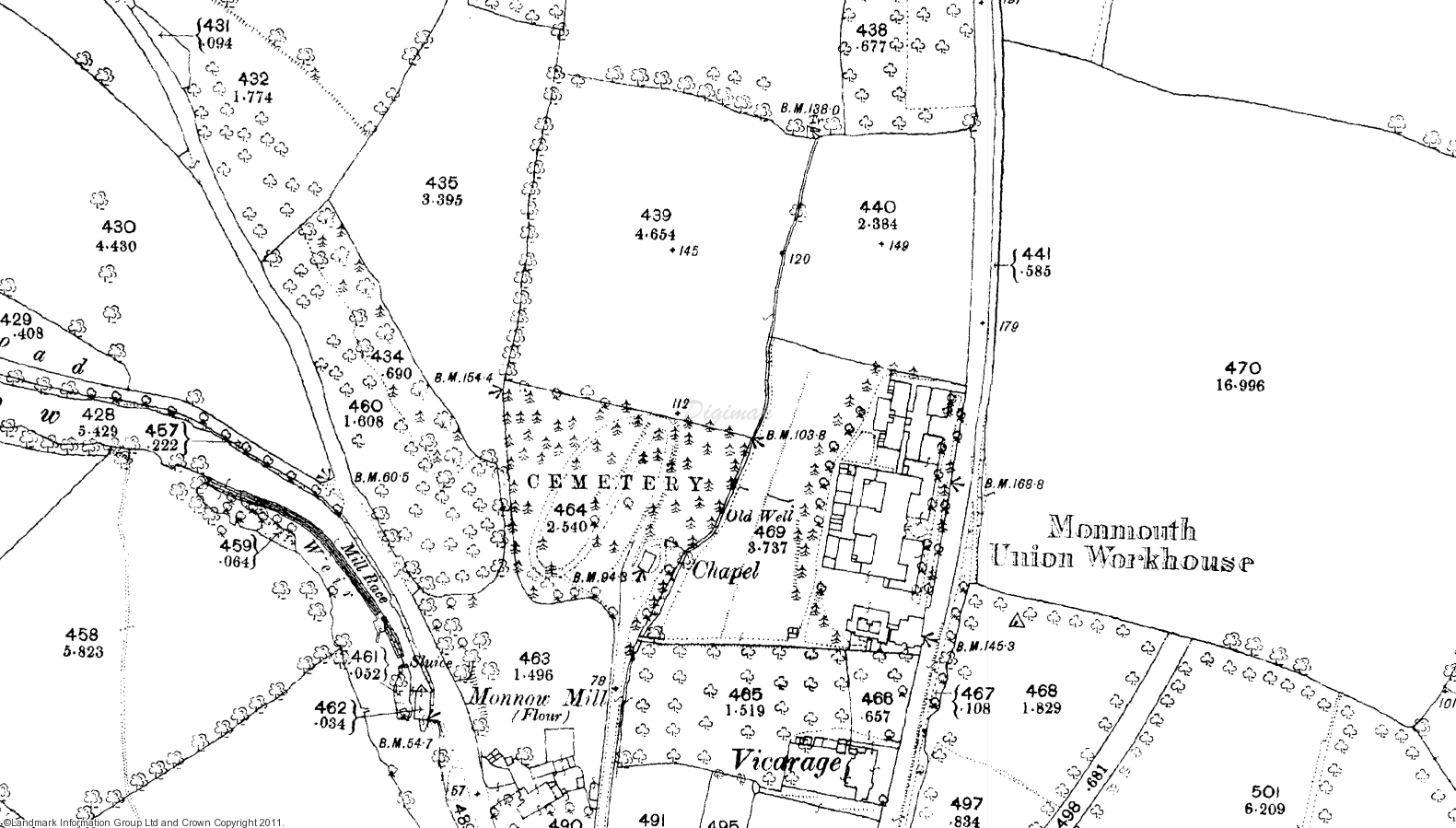
- Map Showing the 1870 Workhouse at its location close to the Cemetery in 1880

General information
- Type: Workhouse
- Opened: 1870
- Cost: £10,000

Design and construction
- Architect: G C Haddon of Hereford
- Main contractor: H. P. Bolt & Co, Newport

In 1870 a new Monmouth Union Workhouse was built to accommodate 200 inmates. It was located on the West side of Hereford Road and consisted of four blocks of buildings: The Lodge, a receiving building, the principal building and the infirmary. The buildings cost £10,000 to build by H. P. Bolt & Co, Newport, and were designed by G C Haddon of Hereford.

The buildings stopped operating as a workhouse sometime after 1932 and the buildings at Hereford Road now form part of the classroom complex for Haberdashers' Monmouth School for Girls.

== History ==
The first recorded Workhouse in Monmouth was in Weirhead street. The building dated from 1760. It was Monmouth's workhouse for about 100 years. The parish gave up the control of the workhouse in 1836 when it became the Union Workhouse. As the Union work house it provided accommodation for up to around thirty parishes in the surrounding area including Gloucestershire and Herefordshire. In the time it was a parish workhouse, inmates would have known each other and families stayed together. When it became the Union workhouse occupants were usually strangers and husbands, wives and children were separated. The building was old and space was cramped which led to violent behavior by inmates.

In 1868 it was decided that a new building was needed and a prize of £50 was offered for the best design. The competition was won by G. C. Haddon. The new building was opened on the Hereford road in 1871. The new union workhouse was an unhappy place. Discipline was strict. The cane was used on all including the very young and the very old. solitary confinement regimes were also in place. The Guardians were all men until the first appointment of a woman was made in 1910. Assaults of staff members were common and publicised quite often. Misfortune was rarely taken into account when punishment was dished out. There was also controversy regarding tenders and monopolies on goods and services provided to the workhouse. Undertakers complained of a single provider of coffins which were quite often converted fruit boxes from Birmingham. There was also a failure to distinguish local misfortune with habitual vagrancy. Some local people set up an Anti-Mendacity society in order to dissuade people from giving money and food to tramps. In 1900 the Guardians of Monmouth Workhouse decided there would be no extra treats at Christmas to avoid the impression that the Union was a charitable institution. The same year the Monmouthshire Beacon reported that inmates were refusing to work at the Union in order to be sent to the Gaol at Usk where conditions were an improvement on the Union.

In 1885 the workhouse came under attack when the Guardians found one Gallon of Gin on the books with £60 spent on liquor by the workhouse master who maintained that it was medicinal. However the secretary of the Western Temperance league worked out that the 167 inmates of the Monmouth Union must have consumed as much wine and spirits as 20,542 less fortunate inmates elsewhere.

== Gallery ==
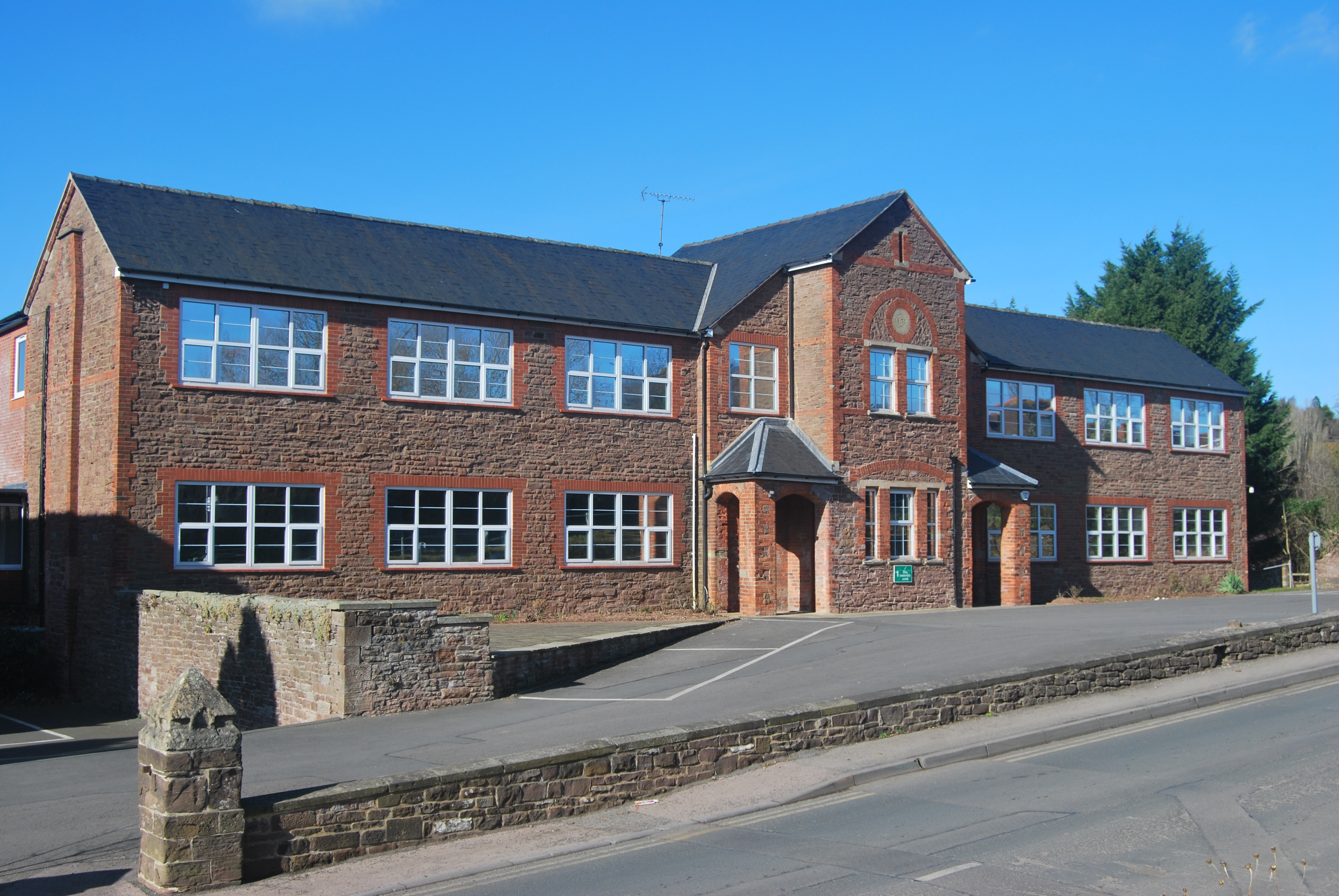
Monmouth Workhouse Principal building

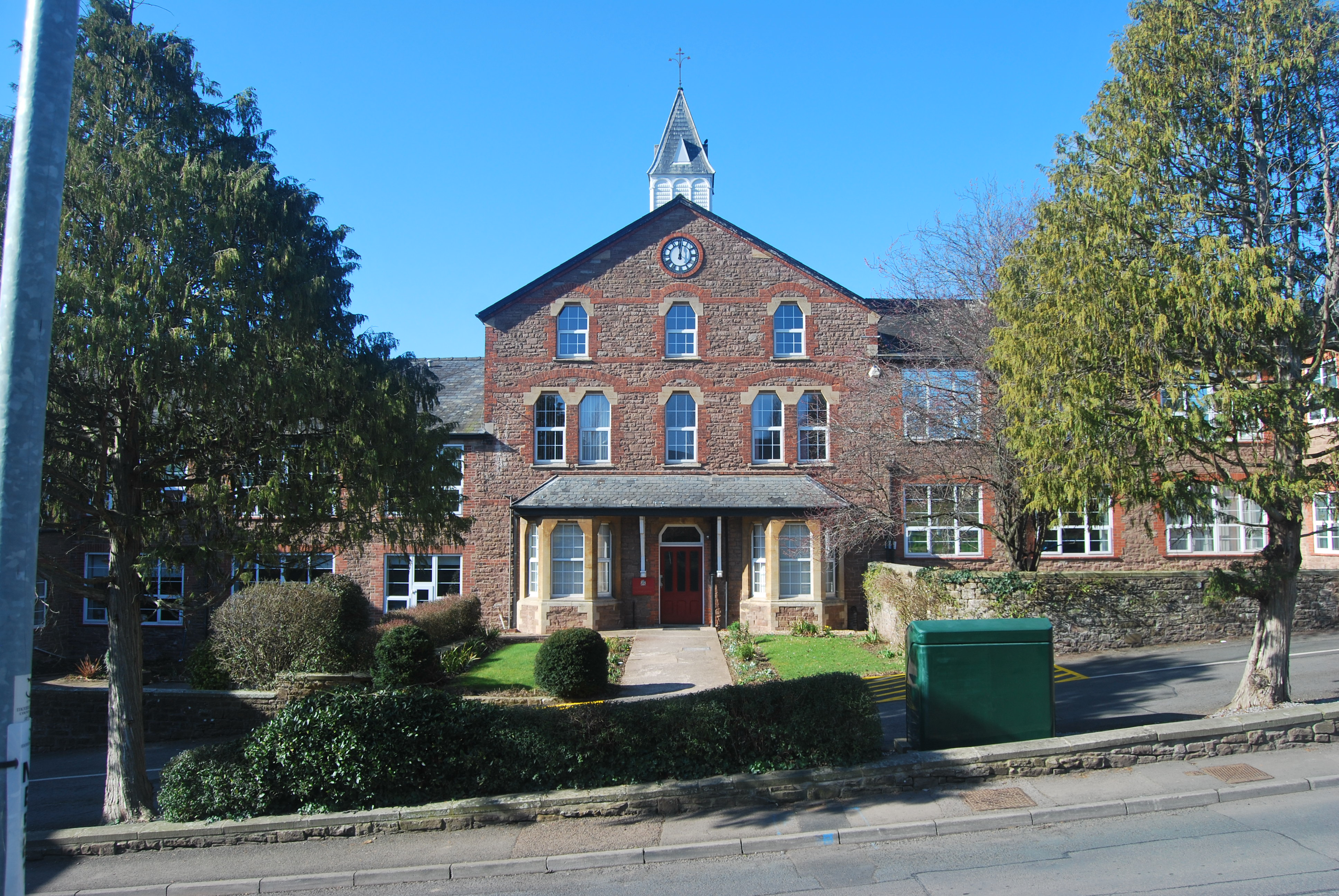
Monmouth Workhouse Receiving building

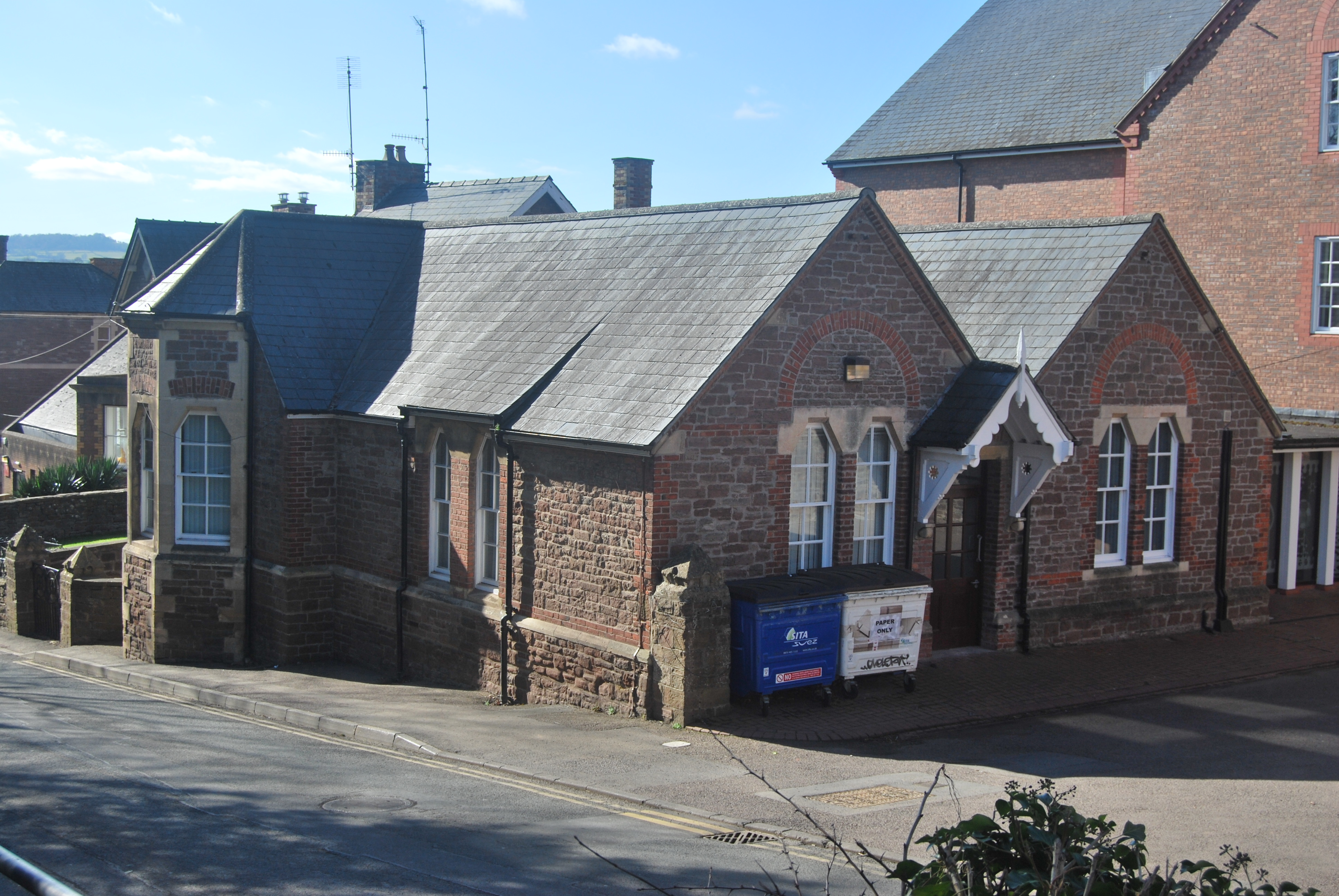
Monmouth Workhouse Infirmary
