= Boverton =

Coordinates: 51.40°N 03.46°W

Boverton: Welsh: Trebefered
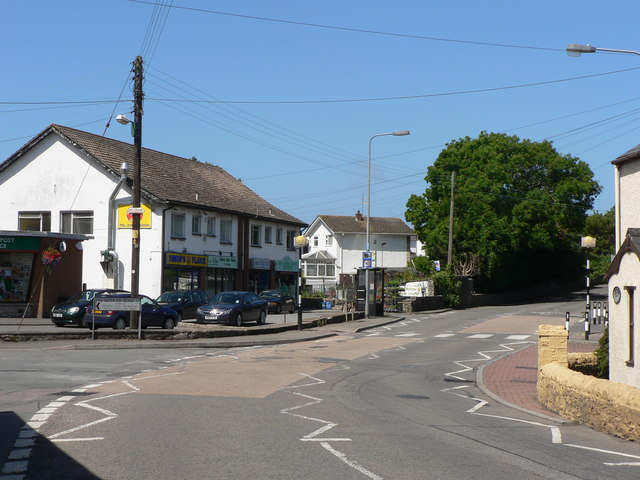
- Boverton village shops

- Location within the Vale of Glamorgan
- OS grid reference: SS983685
- Principal area: Vale of Glamorgan
- Country: Wales
- Sovereign state: United Kingdom
- Post town: Llantwit Major
- Postcode district: CF61
- Police: South Wales
- Fire: South Wales
- Ambulance: Welsh

Boverton (Welsh: Trebefered) is a village located to the east of Llantwit Major in the Vale of Glamorgan in South Wales.

== History ==
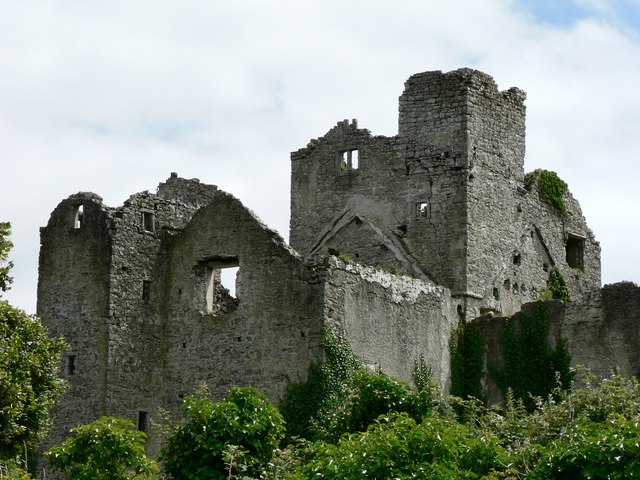
Boverton Castle

Boverton was founded during the reign of William the Conqueror in England. It is thought that he himself founded Boverton as a farming community beneath his mighty castle. However, Robert Fitzhamon is credited with founding the castle here, Boverton Place, during the 12th century. The castle was rebuilt around 1587 by Roger Seys, a land owner and attorney general of Wales. Boverton Place was an "impressive" fortified manor house of considerable size.

The Seys family, prominent in Glamorgan throughout the 17th century, moved out in the late 17th century and it fell into decay in the following century. Local legend states the castle is haunted by the Black Lady who was spotted by men working on the castle in the early 19th Century. She was described as a tall, shadowy figure dressed in mourning clothes.

== Landmarks ==
In present-day Boverton there is a brook, several housing estates, a fish and chip shop, post office, hair salon, gentlemen's barbers, veterinary surgery and The Boverton Castle pub.

== Notable people ==
- Theophilus Redwood (1806–1892), pharmacist, after whom the Redwood Building in Cardiff University was named

== Gallery ==
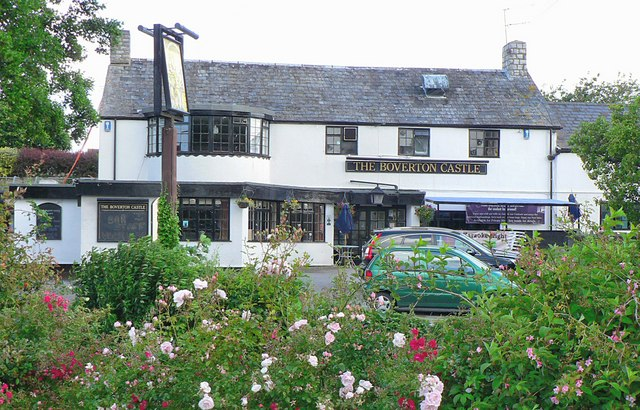
Boverton Castle pub

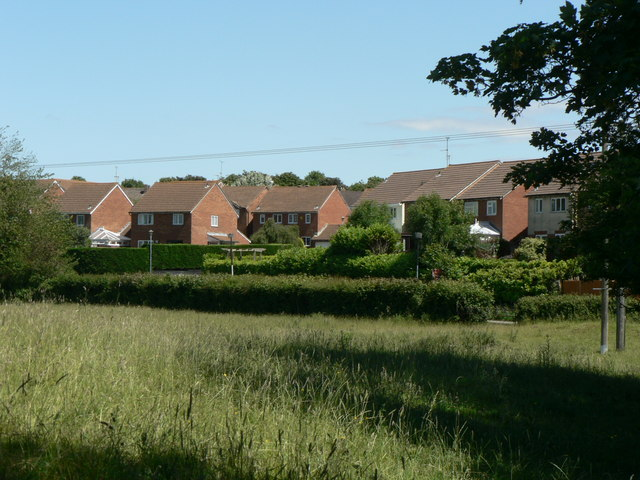
Church Meadow Estate

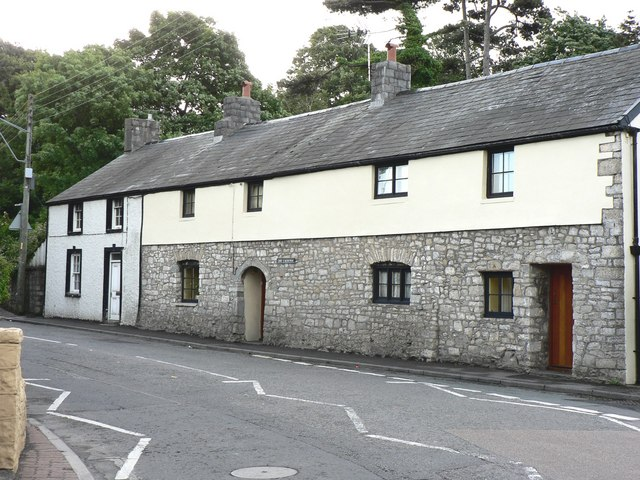
The Causeway

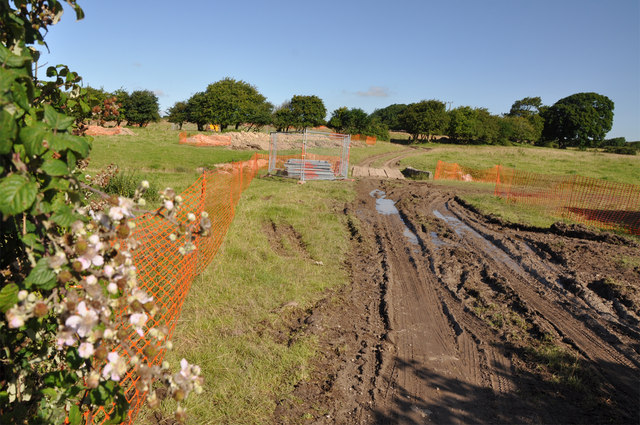
Tremains Farm

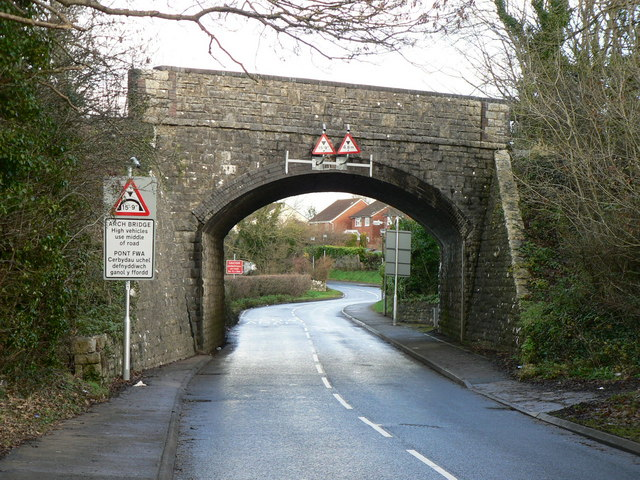
Boverton Bridge

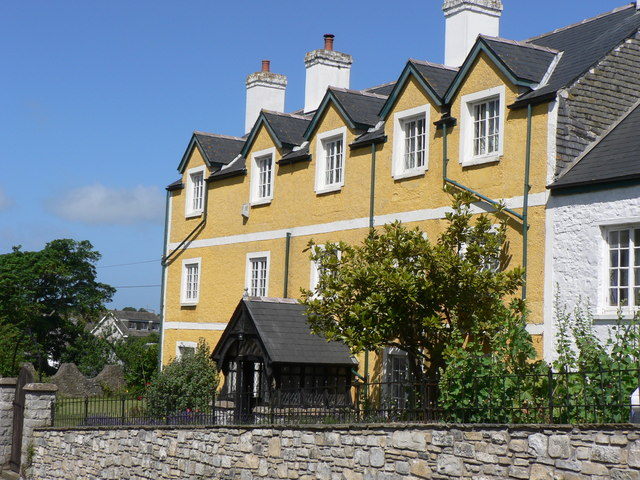
Boverton Court

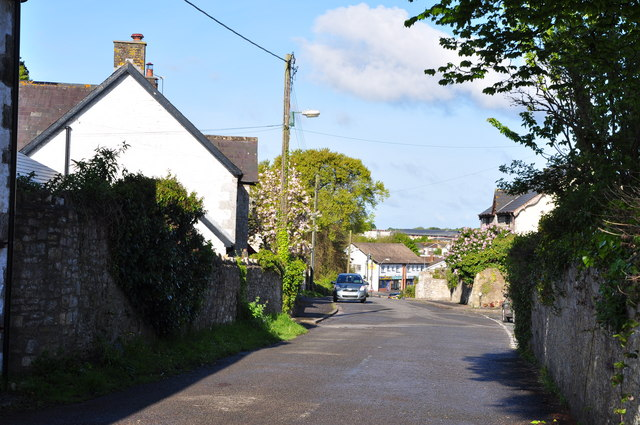
Boverton old road

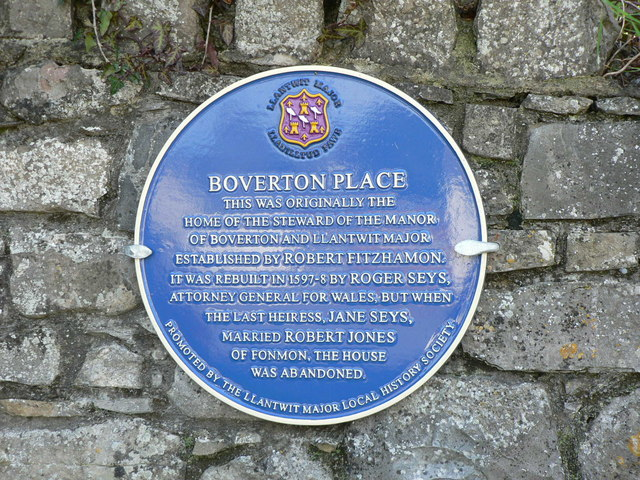
Boverton Place blue plaque
