= Tredegar House Country Park =

Public park in Newport, South Wales

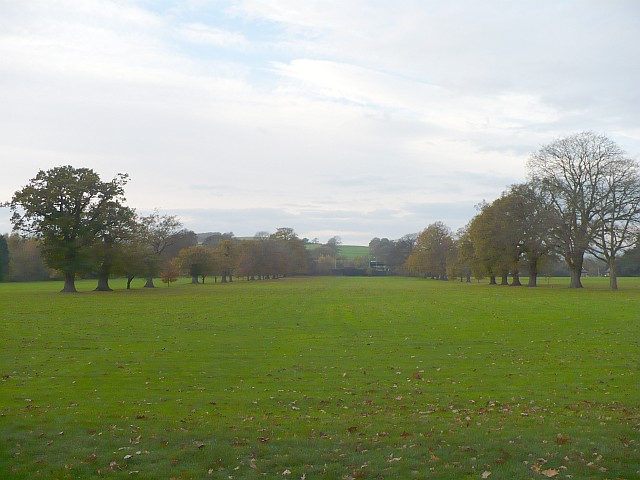
- Tredegar House Country Park
- Interactive map of Tredegar House Country Park
- Location: Coedkernew, Newport, Wales
- Coordinates: 51°33′44″N 3°01′38″W
- Area: 90 acres (36 ha)
- Created: c. 1664
- Founder: William Morgan (of Machen and Tredegar)
- Owner: Newport City Council
- Manager: National Trust
- Website: https://www.nationaltrust.org.uk/tredegar-house

Cadw/ICOMOS Register of Parks and Gardens of Special Historic Interest in Wales
- Official name: Tredegar Park
- Designated: 1 February 2022; 4 years ago
- Reference no.: PGW(Gt)48(NPT)
- Listing: Grade II*

Tredegar House Country Park is a landscaped park in the community of Coedkernew, in Newport, Wales. The park forms the grounds of Tredegar House, for over 500 years the home of the Morgan family. The park was first laid-out in the 1660s in a formal style. Beginning in the 1790s, when the park reached its circa 1,000-acre (400 ha) greatest extent, Adam Mickle (c. 1747–1811) deformalised the park and added the lake. Encroaching building developments in the 20th-century caused the park to become fragmented, today spanning only 90-acre (36 ha). In 1951, the Morgan family sold Tredegar House and Park to the Sisters of St. Joseph who used the property as a school until 1974, when it was bought by Newport County Council. Since 2012 it has been managed by the National Trust as part of a 50-year lease agreement with the council. It is Grade II*-listed on the Cadw/ICOMOS Register of Parks and Gardens of Special Historic Interest in Wales for "the survival of parts of grand late seventeenth-century layout, including garden walls, gatescreen, inorganic parterres and avenue."

== History ==
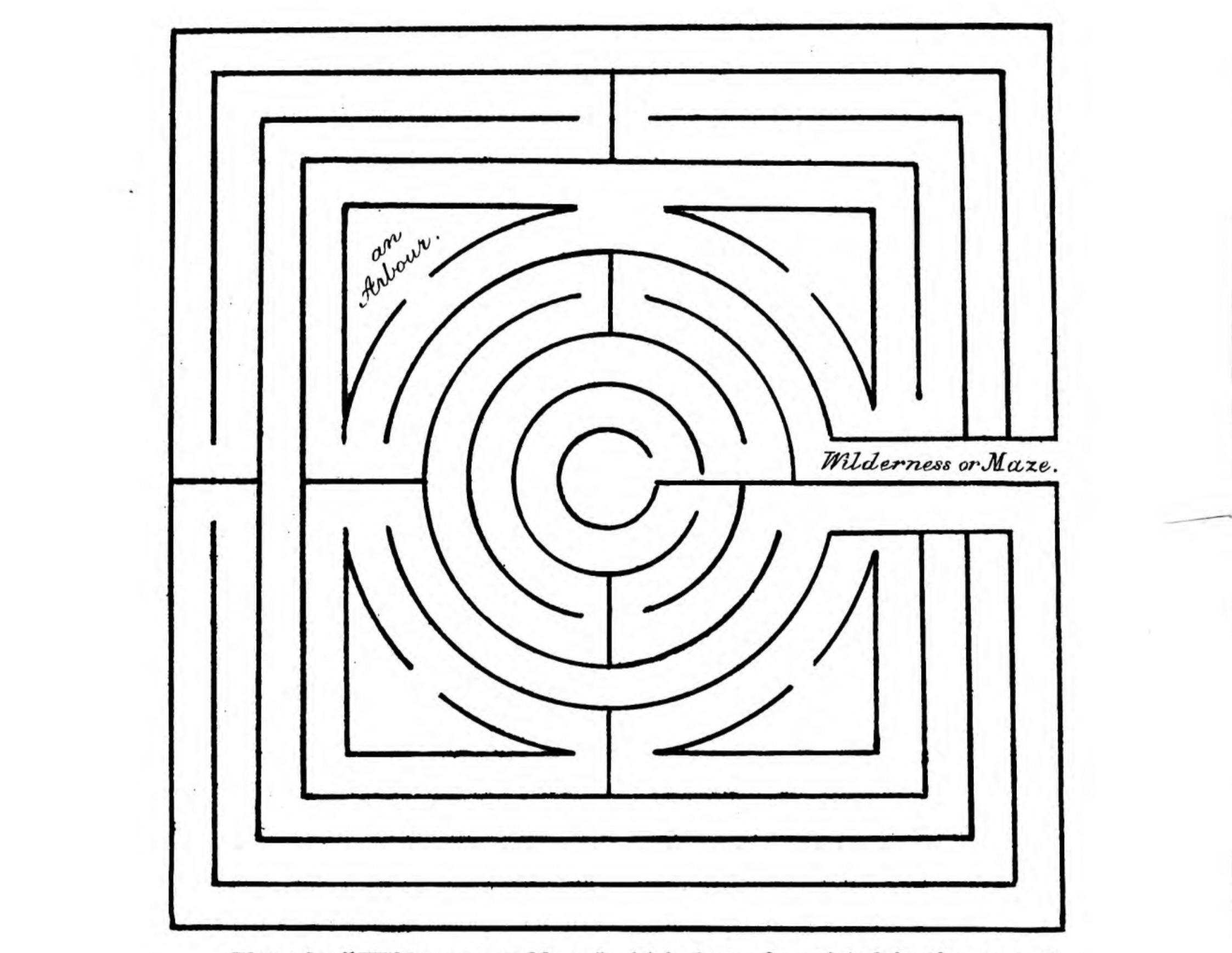
Plan of a "Wilderness or Maze" which was probably laid out in the Elizabethan period and existed in the park as late as the 1660s.

The park is centred around Tredegar House, where the Morgan family lived since at least 1402, departing in 1951; the earliest description of a house at Tredegar is of "a faire place of stone", recorded by John Leland in around 1540. In an 1882 paper for the Monmouthshire and Caerleon Antiquarian Association, Octavius Morgan gives a tracing for a "Wilderness or Maze" taken from a 1660s plan of Tredegar House and Park, which he states was "probably laid out in the time of Queen Elizabeth". Cadw states that William Morgan was the first to lay out a landscaped park at Tredegar after 1664, which included four compartments of walled gardens and seven great axial avenues of trees, and encompassed an Iron Age hillfort at its north. Around the same time, he demolished much of the stone house recorded by Leland, building in its place a grand red-brick house in the Restoration style: this is the present-day Tredegar House. To the rear of the stable block built around this time is an orangery, probably built after 1715. The orangery was built surrounded by one of the aforementioned walled gardens, subsequently known as the "Orangery Garden" and laid out formally with "inorganic parterre with central and perimeter paths plus a small mount in the west corner". Of the seven tree avenues, only one remains, running across the park from the north-west wing of Tredegar House; this is known as "Oak Avenue".

In 1792, Sir Charles Morgan inherited the Tredegar Estate and, realising its wealth of coal and iron, began to lease parts of it to mining companies. The Monmouthshire Canal Navigation Act 1802 (42 Geo. 3. c. cxv) authorised the building of a tramroad from the Sirhowy Valley to Newport to transport minerals, around a mile of which passed through Tredegar Park. The act permitted Sir Charles to use the section as a toll road ("having the benefit of the Tolls to arise thereon"), which in 1883 was reported to generate £10,000 per year in revenue; this profitability earned the tollroad the name "The Golden Mile". Such business foresights greatly expanded the family's fortune.

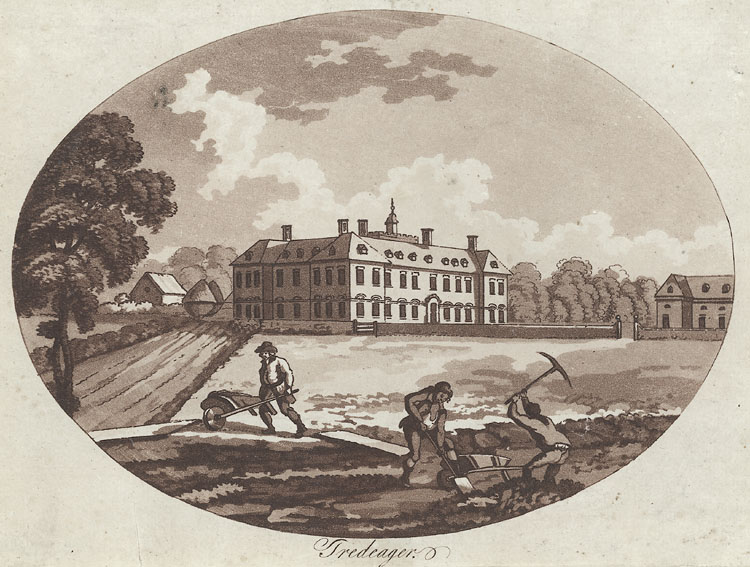
1795: The building of the "Great Pool" (foreground) with Tredegar House (centre) and Stables (right) in the background.

The lake in 2018.

Beginning in the 1790s, the park was landscaped by Adam Mickle (c. 1747–1811), who had worked under Capability Brown. Mickle deformalised the park, removing many of the tree avenues and adding a lake ("Great Pool") to the north of the house. The park reached its greatest extent at this time, spanning around 1000 acres (400 ha).

In the 1920s, a small Italianate sunken rose garden was added to the south of Mickle's lake. During the Second World War, the park was used by the military. It housed Nissen huts for the soldiers (initially British and later including Canadians and Americans) and military vehicles in preparation for the Normandy Landings. Graffiti signatures made by the soldiers still exist on the internal walls of the stable block.

In May 1949, Tredegar House and Park were inherited by John Morgan, later the sixth and last Lord Tredegar. Owing to taxation and extravagant spending, the Morgan fortune was in decline, and the property had not been occupied for some years. There was a possibility that Tredegar House and Park would be transferred to the National Trust in lieu of death duties. A May 1950 report on the property by the Chief District Valuer for Newport on behalf of the Trust records of the park, "The kitchen gardens are fairly well maintained, but the ornamental gardens are somewhat neglected." The report also notes that at this time the park spanned 270 acres (110 ha). The plan for the property to be transferred to the National Trust did not go ahead, and in 1951, John Morgan sold Tredegar House and Park to the Sisters of St. Joseph who used the property as a school. In 1974, it was bought by Newport County Council. Since 2012 it has been managed by the National Trust as part of a 50-year lease agreement with the council. In 2022, it was designated as Grade II* on the Cadw/ICOMOS Register of Parks and Gardens of Special Historic Interest in Wales.

=== Separation and redevelopment ===
In the 20th century, the park became fragmented and much reduced. One instance of fragmentation occurred in 1922, when Lord Tredegar gave part of the park near Pye Corner for use as a golf course, which in the 21st century was redeveloped into the Golden Mile View and Carnegie Court housing estates. There was another reduction in 1927 when Lord Tredegar gave a further 70 acres (28 ha) flanked by the A48 to Newport for recreational use, which subsequently became known as "Tredegar Park Recreation Ground". The park was further fragmented following the sale of Tredegar House and Estate in 1951 and 1957 respectively: the remaining avenue of trees was intercepted during the building of the M4 motorway in the late 1960s, and a 96-acre (39 ha) portion of the park was developed into the Duffryn housing estate in 1978. This separation of the park precludes it of Grade I status; today it spans only 90 acres (36 ha).

Golden Mile View in 2023, built on land previously part of the Tredegar Park Golf Course.

Photographed from Tredegar Park in 2018, the M4 motorway intercepts the remaining "great axial avenue" of trees.

The Duffryn housing estate under construction in 1977. The estate occupies what was the south portion of Tredegar Park.

== Parkrun ==
Parkrun (a UK-wide running series) takes place in the grounds of the park each Saturday at 9am. The first event was hosted in 2011. As of May 2024, 586 runs have been held, attracting 20,284 runners. An average of over 300 people compete each week, however some events have attracted up to 700 competitors.

== National Eisteddfodau ==
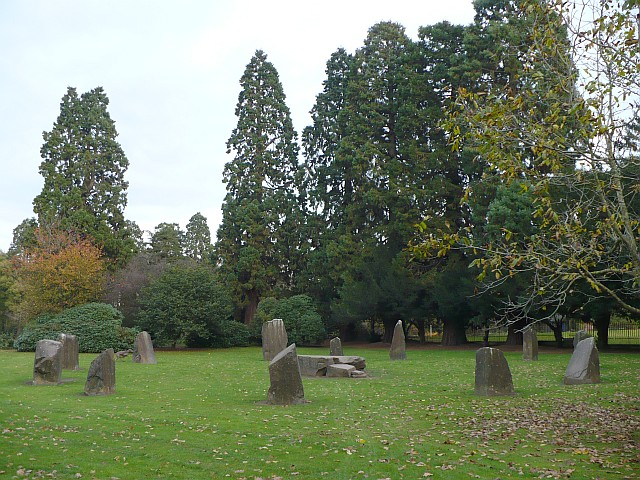
The stone circle in 2007, erected to commemorate the 1988 Eisteddfod in Tredegar Park.

The park was the venue for the National Eisteddfod of Wales in 1988 and 2004. It is the planned venue for the 2027 Urdd National Eisteddfod (National Youth Eisteddfod).

== See also ==
- List of gardens in Wales
