= Marshfield, Newport =

Marshfield: Welsh: Maerun
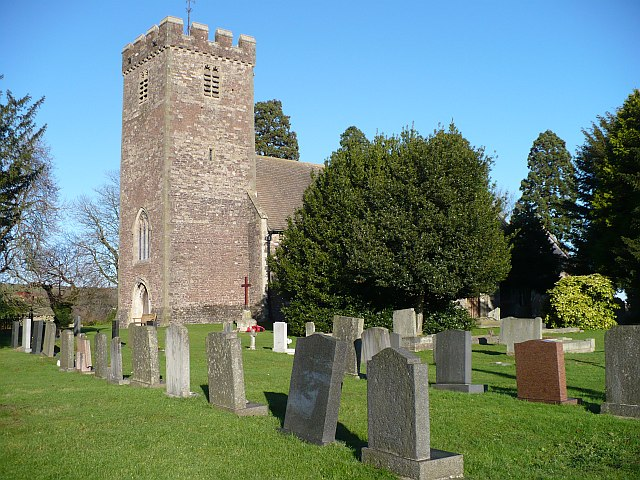
- St Mary the Virgin parish church

- Location within Newport
- Population: 6,270 (Ward, 2011 census)
- OS grid reference: ST275833
- Principal area: Newport
- Country: Wales
- Sovereign state: United Kingdom
- Post town: NEWPORT
- Postcode district: NP10
- Post town: CARDIFF
- Postcode district: CF3
- Dialling code: 01633; Castleton exchange
- Police: Gwent
- Fire: South Wales
- Ambulance: Welsh
- UK Parliament: Newport West and Islwyn
- Senedd Cymru – Welsh Parliament: Newport West
- List of places UK Wales Newport 51°32′13.38″N 3°3′55.8″W Map of the community

Marshfield (Welsh: Maerun) is a village and community of Newport, Wales. It sits approximately 5 miles (8 km) southwest of Newport, and 7 miles (11 km) northeast of Cardiff. The area is governed by Newport City Council. The community includes Castleton. Its population in 2011 was 3,054.

== Description ==
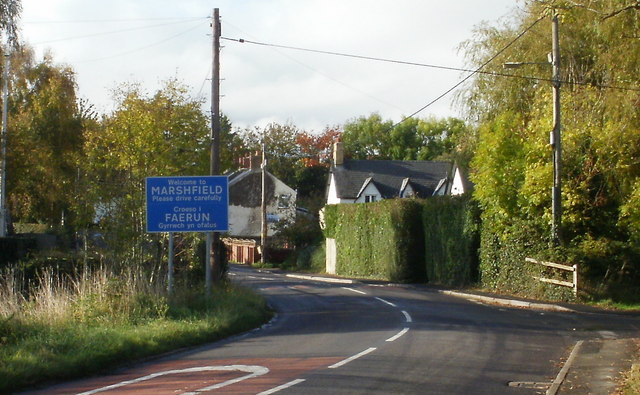
Welcome to Marshfield

John Leland recorded the village under the Welsh name of Mairin in the 1530s, adding that it was the location of a house belonging to the gentleman Thomas Lewys.

Today the ward is bounded by Cardiff to the southwest, Caerphilly to the northwest, the Bristol Channel to the south, the mouth of the River Usk to the east, Graig ward to the north, and Tredegar Park and Gaer wards to the northeast. The community is bound by the city boundary to the west, the A48(M) to the north and Great Western Main Line to the south. The eastern boundary with Coedkernew is formed by the Nant y Selsig ("sausage brook"). The area forms a green belt between the cities of Cardiff and Newport. There are bus services to both cities.

Marshfield has a village hall, post office, chemist and shop. There are two churches: the Church in Wales parish church of St Mary's and Gateway Baptist Church. In 2017, a multi-use games area was installed on the village hall grounds. The village has one primary school, Marshfield Primary School, which includes a nursery. The local secondary schools are Bassaleg School and St Joseph's Roman Catholic High School. The nearest independent school is St John's College in Old St Mellons. The ward is home to the UK Patent Office and Office for National Statistics.

== Church of St Mary the Virgin ==
The parish church is dedicated to St Mary and is a Grade II* listed building. It is believed to have been built in 1135 in memory of Robert Fitzhamon, Lord of Glamorgan and Wentlooge. It has a crenelated Perpendicular style tower and a 15th-century south porch. It was founded by Mabel FitzRobert, Countess of Gloucester, after whom Cefn Mably was named.

== Sport ==
Marshfield A.F.C. football team plays in the Newport and District Football League. They played in the Gwent County League Division 1 in the 2013–14 season, having won three successive promotions after finishing as champions of the Newport and District Football League 'Premier X' division. There is provision for golf, cricket, and equestrianism in the area.

== Governance ==
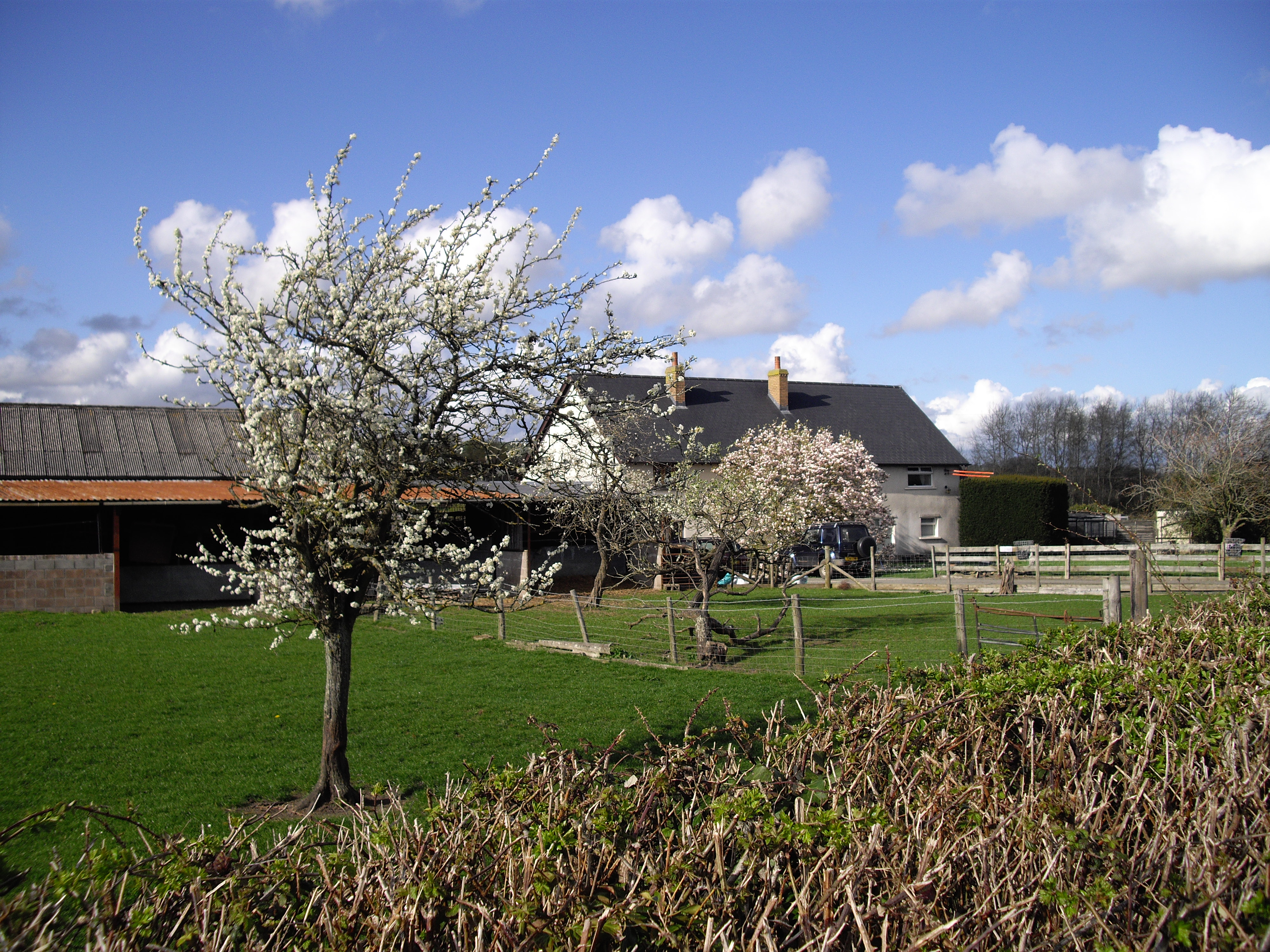
Court Farm

Marshfield Community Council represents the area on local authorities and public bodies. It has responsibility for issues including local planning applications, community events and facilities, and protection of the local environment. It works with the police, Newport City Council and other local service providers.

Until the 2022 local elections, Marshfield was the name of an electoral ward, represented on Newport City Council by two councillors. The ward contained the parishes Coedkernew, Michaelston-y-Fedw, Wentlooge, and Marshfield. Following a boundary review, Marshfield was merged with neighbouring Tredegar Park to become Tredegar Park and Marshfield, electing three councillors.

The ward falls within the district or borough of Newport, which was formed on 1 April 1974 under the Local Government Act 1972, having previously been part of Magor and St Mellons Rural District. The Senedd constituency and UK Parliamentary constituency is Newport West.

== Notable people ==
- Lynn Davies (born 1942), 1964 Summer Olympics long jump champion
- Sabrina Cohen-Hatton (born 1983), Chief Fire Officer of the West Sussex Fire and Rescue Service, psychologist and writer, lived in the village
- Jamie Corsi (born 1987), rugby union player, Head of Rugby at Bristol Grammar School
