= Tredunnock =

Village in Monmouthshire, Wales

Coordinates: 51.6486°N 2.8985°W

Tredunnock: Welsh: Tredynog
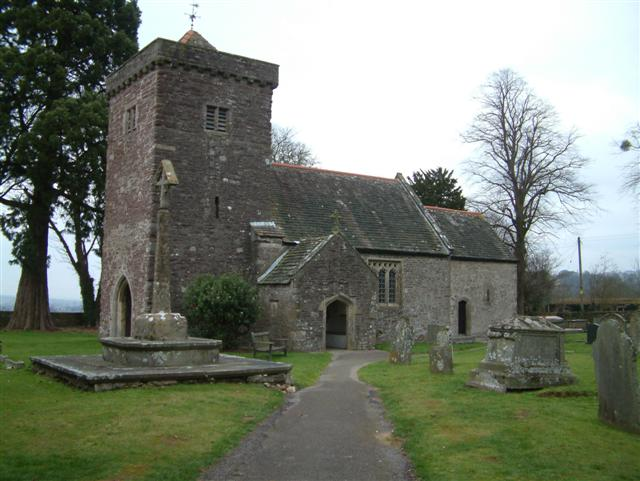
- St. Andrew's Church

- Location within Monmouthshire
- Population: 100
- OS grid reference: ST379948
- Principal area: Monmouthshire
- Preserved county: Gwent
- Country: Wales
- Sovereign state: United Kingdom
- Post town: USK
- Postcode district: NP15
- Dialling code: 01633
- Police: Gwent
- Fire: South Wales
- Ambulance: Welsh
- UK Parliament: Monmouth

Tredunnock (Welsh: Tredynog) is a small village in Monmouthshire, south east Wales, in the United Kingdom. Tredunnock is located four miles (6.4 km) northeast of Caerleon and four miles south of Usk.

== Geography ==
The River Usk near Tredunnock

The River Usk passes close by just below the village in the Vale of Usk and across the river lies the Wentwood escarpment. The town is located 4 miles (6.4 km) northeast of Caerleon and four miles south of Usk, on a minor road to the west of the A449 road from Newport to Monmouth.

== History and amenities ==
Writing in the Imperial Gazetteer of England and Wales in 1870 to 1872, the historian John Marius Wilson described the village thus: "Tredunnock, a parish in Newport district, Monmouth; 4¼ miles S of Usk r. station. Post town, Llan-gibby, under Newport, Monmouth. Acres, 1,393. Real property, £1,606. Pop., 164. Houses, 32. The property is divided among a few. The living is a rectory in the diocese of Llandaff. Value, £208. Patron, H. Leigh, Esq. The church is good."

The parish church of St Andrew, which has a 14th-century tower, contains a Roman tablet dedicated to a soldier of the Second Augustan Legion, the Legio II Augusta, by his wife. The graveyard contains the tomb of Isabella Gell, wife of Rev John Philip Gell and only daughter of Sir John Franklin pioneer of the Northwest Passage.

In the early 19th century, at the time of William Coxe's visit to the area, there was a forge at Trostrey, near Kemeys Commander, from which bar iron was sent by road to "Tredunnock bridge" for conveyance down river to Newport and onward for export to Bristol.
