= Redwick, Newport =

Redwick: Welsh: Y Redwig
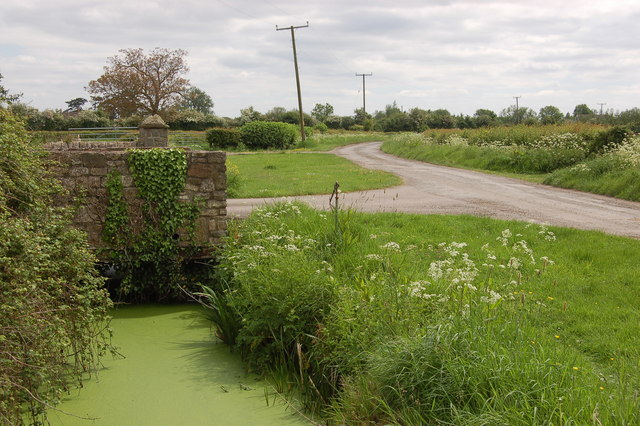
- Longlands Lane crossing the Caldicot Levels towards Redwick

- Location within Newport
- Population: 194 (2001 census)
- OS grid reference: ST421841
- Principal area: Newport
- Country: Wales
- Sovereign state: United Kingdom
- Post town: CALDICOT
- Postcode district: NP26
- Dialling code: 01633; Magor exchange
- Police: Gwent
- Fire: South Wales
- Ambulance: Welsh
- UK Parliament: Newport East
- Senedd Cymru – Welsh Parliament: Newport East
- List of places UK Wales Newport 51.55280°N 2.83648°W Map of the community

Redwick (Welsh: Y Redwig) is a small village and community to the south east of the city of Newport, in Wales, United Kingdom. It lies within the Newport city boundaries, in the historic county of Monmouthshire and the preserved county of Gwent. In 2011 the population was 206.

== Location ==
Redwick is located on the Caldicot Levels, about 8 miles (13 km) south east of the centre of Newport and some 4 miles (6.4 km) south west of Caldicot, Monmouthshire on the flat coastal lands reclaimed from the Severn Estuary and Bristol Channel. The village of Magor lies about 3 miles (4.8 km) to the north east.

== The Church ==
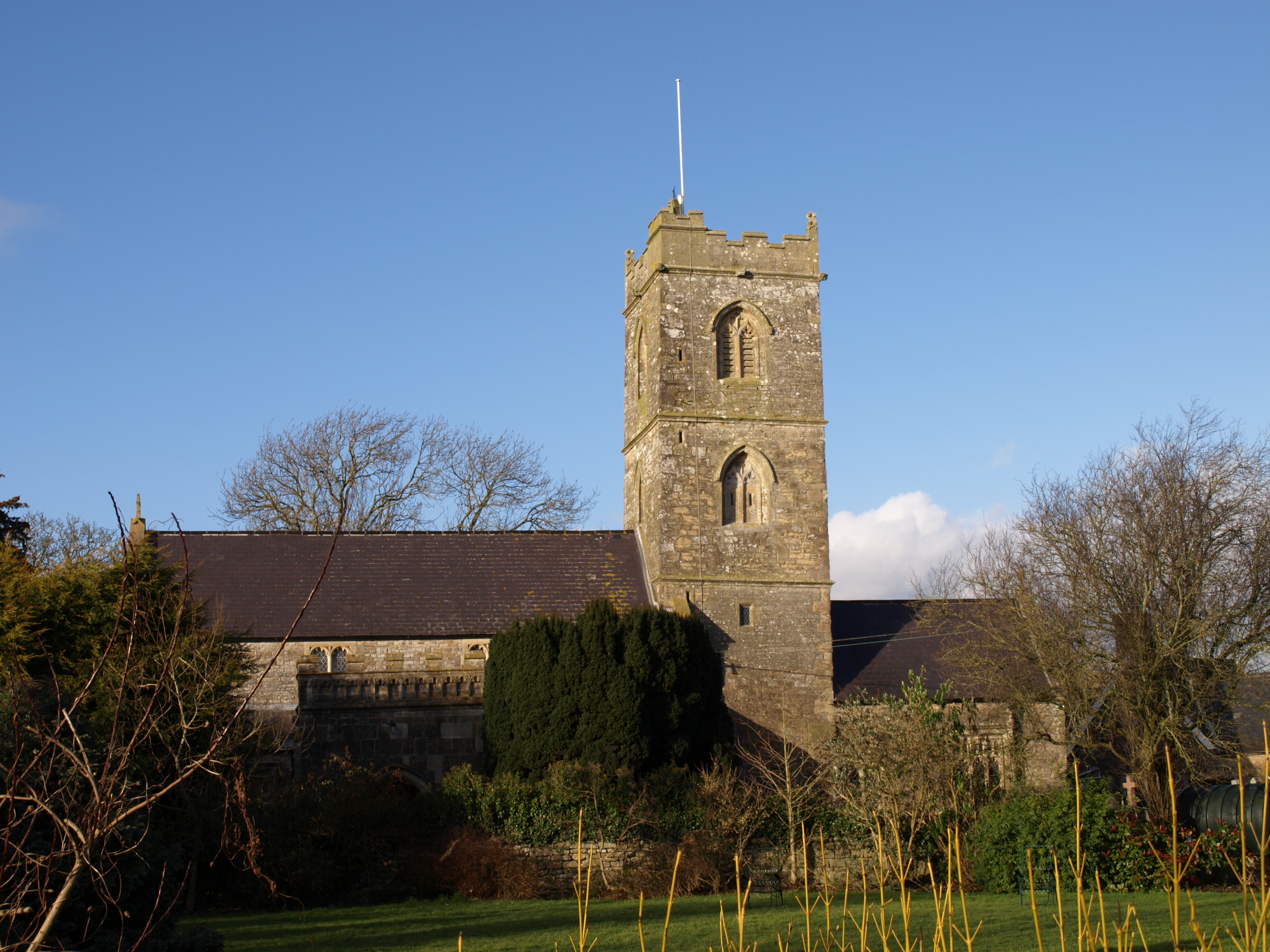
Church of St Thomas the Apostle

The ancient parish church of St. Thomas is a Grade I listed building. An earlier dedication, when it belonged to Tintern Abbey, appears to have been to St. Michael. It is held with Magor. The building has some unusual features: It is unusually large for a parish church on the Caldicot and Wentloog Levels, with only the church at Peterstone being of comparable size; it has a full-immersion baptistry, unique medieval stone carvings and a fine Victorian pipe organ salvaged from two previous churches. On the south porch is a distinctive "scratch post" or "Mass sundial" and (like the church at nearby Goldcliff) it has a mark indicating the flood level of the water inundation caused by the Bristol Channel flood, 1607. The font originates from the 13th century and may have been an original feature.

Its embattled and pinnacled central tower contain six bells, the fourth and fifth of which are pre-Reformation bells from the Bristol foundry, dated circa 1350–80, making them some of the oldest church bells working anywhere in the country. Following their lowering in the tower in the 1990s, the bells are rung from the chancel in full view of the congregation, although a number of old unused rope bosses suggest that this must have also been the case at some time in the past. The newest bell is the treble (lightest bell) which was added in celebration of Queen Elizabeth II's 40 years on the throne. The East window, which contains some painted glass from about 1870, escaped the nearby German Luftwaffe bomb blast of 1942, unlike the roof and the other windows. The 1875 restoration and re-modelling of the church, including the raised tiled floor, was by John Norton, who was later involved in the design of the chapel at Tyntesfield in Somerset.

== Notable features ==
The Rose Inn

The village pub is the Rose Inn, a free house situated on South Row. In May 2011, after a four-year wait, a grant of £316,323 from the Big Lottery Fund was confirmed, alongside £200,000 from the Welsh Assembly, for the replacement of the existing 60-year-old Village Hall. Mead Farm Foods is based at Mead Farm, run by sixth-generation farmers Lawrence and Izabela Hembrow.

== History ==
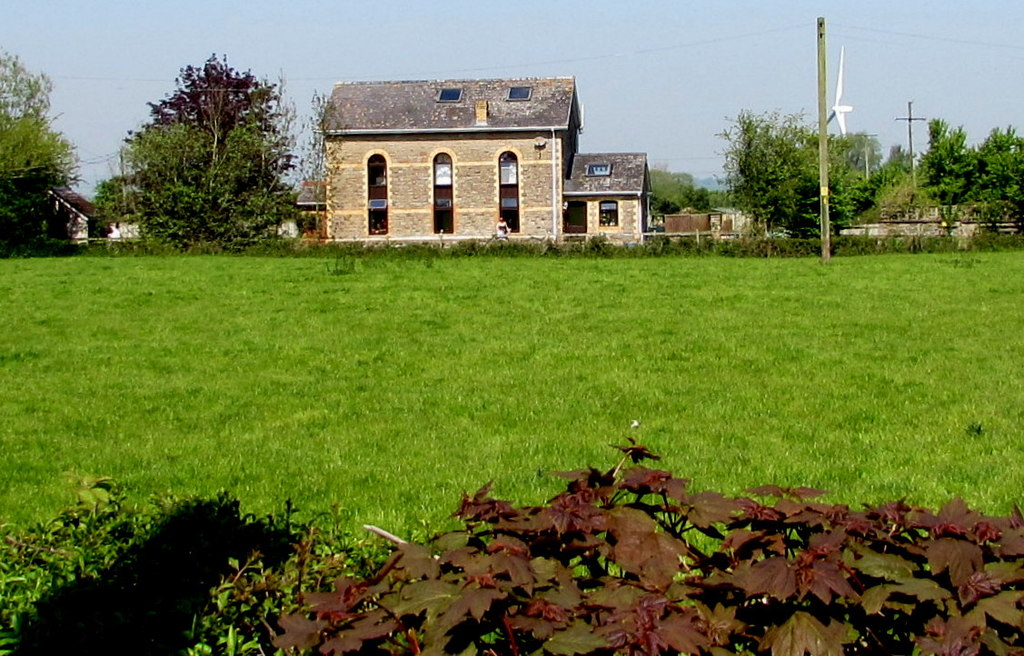
Former Salem Baptist Chapel, North Row

The church registers, which date from 1787, record that the last man to be hanged for stealing sheep in Monmouthshire was charged before local magistrates assembled at The Great House in the village.

Salem Baptist Chapel was erected in 1832. By 1851, when the minister was Thomas Leonard, morning attendance was 21, with 13 scholars, and evening attendance was 68. In 1994 the building was converted into a private residence.

== Government ==
The area is in the Llanwern electoral ward and governed by the Newport City Council. Redwick also has its own community council.
