= Ebbw River =

River in south Wales

Coordinates: 51°33′N 2°59′W

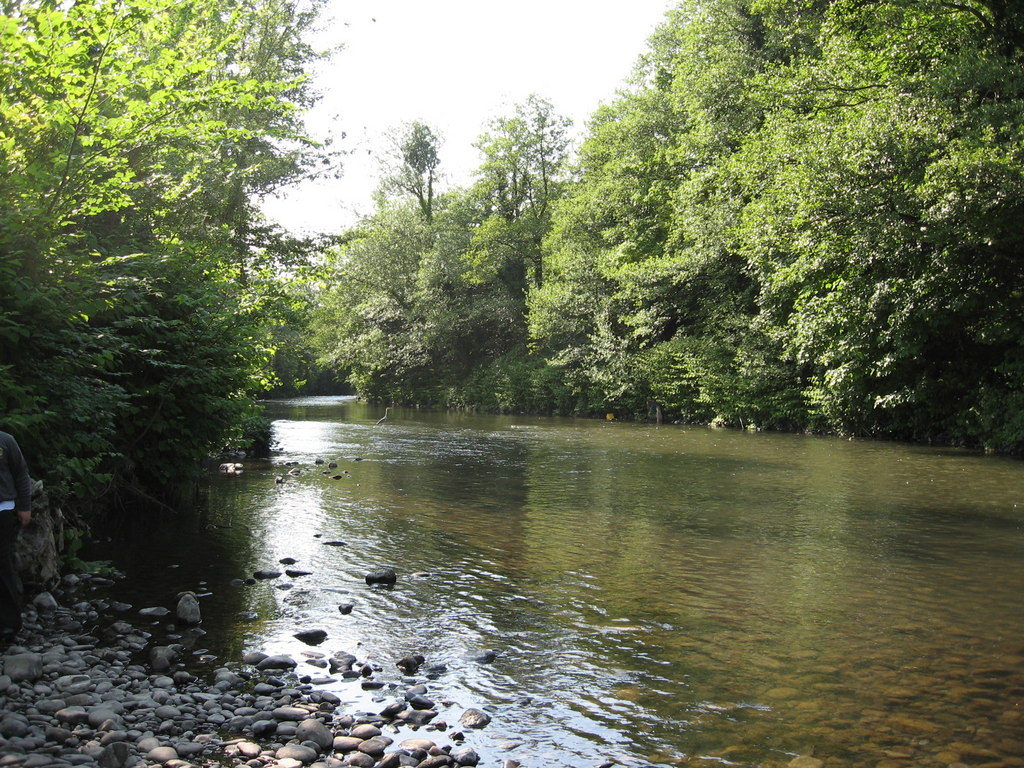
Ebbw River at Tredegar Park

The Ebbw River (/ˈɛbuː/; Welsh: Afon Ebwy) is a river in South East Wales which runs from its source near the town of Ebbw Vale to the River Usk 25 miles south, below the city of Newport at the Severn Estuary. Upstream of the river, the Ebbw Fach (Welsh: Afon Ebwy Fach; meaning little Ebbw River) joins the main river, the Ebbw Fawr, at Aberbeeg. The Ebbw Fach is itself fed by a left-bank tributary, the River Tyleri, from Cwmtillery.

== Toponymy ==
In common with the names of the nearby Sirhowy River and Rhymney River, the name for the Ebbw River is in a reverse order of the names of rivers that are close to it, for example, that of the River Taff, which is to the west of it, and the River Usk, into which it flows.

== Route ==
The Sirhowy River joins the Ebbw River at Crosskeys, then the river flows south east, through the town of Risca, then through the western suburbs of Newport, alongside Tredegar Park. The tidal Ebbw joins with the estuarine River Usk seaward of Newport, before flowing into the Mouth of the Severn.
