= Coedkernew =

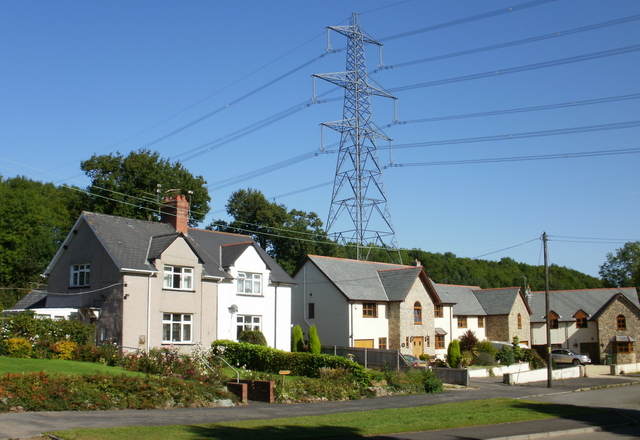
- Blacksmiths Way, Coedkernew

- Location within Newport
- Population: 2,187 (2021 census)
- OS grid reference: ST280840
- Community: Coedkernew
- Principal area: Newport
- Country: Wales
- Sovereign state: United Kingdom
- Post town: NEWPORT
- Postcode district: NP10
- Dialling code: 01633; Maesglas and Castleton exchanges
- Police: Gwent
- Fire: South Wales
- Ambulance: Welsh
- UK Parliament: Newport West
- List of places UK Wales Newport 51.55028°N 3.03979°W Map of the community

Coedkernew (Welsh: Coedcernyw) is a community in the south west of Newport, Wales, in the Marshfield ward.

The parish is bounded by Percoed reen to the south, Nant-y-Selsig to the southwest, and Pound Hill to the west. The northern boundary is formed from Gwern-y-cleppa to junction 28 of the M4, then the A48 Cardiff Road. The eastern boundary is formed from the Ebbw River Bridge roundabout to the west of the International Rectifier plant, Duffryn Drive, along the southern edge of Tredegar House Country Park, Pencarn Lane and Percoed Lane.

Despite being a rural parish to the south and west, the north and east has seen large increases in population in recent years due to the continued suburbanisation of Newport; it grew from 574 in 2001 to 2,187 in 2021. This built-up area of Coedkernew forms a crescent around Duffryn and as such, much of the newer private housing in the area actually falls within Coedkernew.

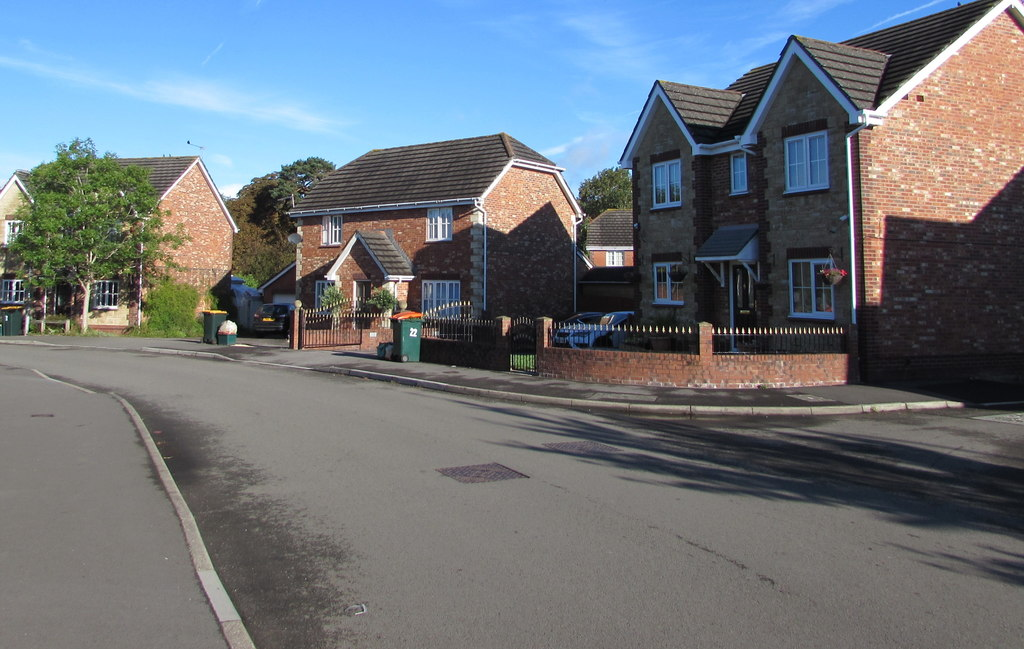
Grosmont Way, Celtic Horizons

This area contains the landmark Coedkernew footbridge over the A48, Vantage Data, three business parks (Imperial Park, Celtic Springs and Cleppa Park), the Patent Office, the Office for National Statistics, Tredegar House, the Celtic Horizons estate, and St. Joseph's RC High School.

The remains of a prehistoric burial chamber, believed to be neolithic, can be found at the northern boundary near Gwern-y-cleppa . Coedkernew is also considered to be one of the possible sites for early medieval activity in Gwynllwg, as well as a potential site for the church of Gwladys due to its proximity to the abandoned settlement of Pencarn.

== Government ==
The area is governed by Newport City Council and Coedkernew community council.
