= Wilcrick =

Coordinates: 51.58684°N 2.85443°W

Wilcrick: Welsh: Chwilgrug
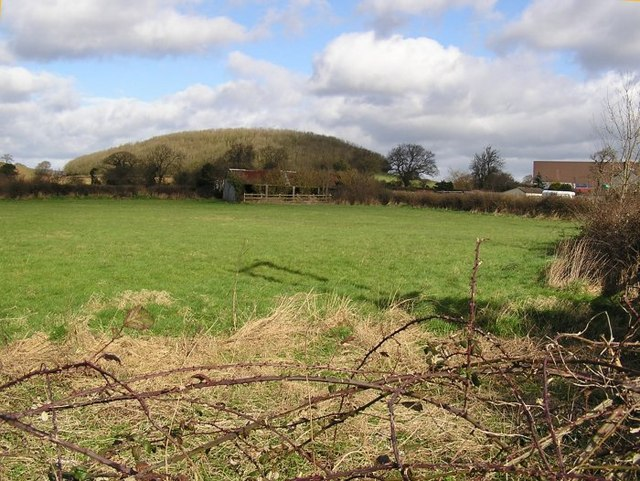
- Wilcrick Hill
- Population: 24 (1961 census)
- OS grid reference: ST409879
- Principal area: Newport
- Preserved county: Gwent
- Country: Wales
- Sovereign state: United Kingdom
- Post town: CALDICOT
- Postcode district: NP26
- Dialling code: 01633
- Police: Gwent
- Fire: South Wales
- Ambulance: Welsh
- UK Parliament: Newport East

Wilcrick (Welsh: Chwilgrug) is a hamlet within the administrative boundary of the city of Newport, South Wales, just to the west of Magor and approximately 7 miles (11 km) southeast of Newport city centre. It is within the historic county of Monmouthshire.

== Etymology ==
The name translates from the Welsh as a "bare hill" or "mound".

== Archaeology ==
Willcrick is located on the B4245 road to the northwest of Magor. To the southeast of the village is Wilcrick Hill which has a hillfort on its summit, of which only the earthworks remain. Archaeological evidence of a small Iron Age settlement found preserved under peat at Barland's Farm suggests that the occupiers may have used the Caldicot and Wentloog Levels to pasture their cattle when conditions permitted, and may have moved into the hillfort when the Levels were too wet to be useable.

Nearby, a nearly complete 3rd century Romano-British oak boat was found beside a buried stone and timber quay in 1993, during the building of a distribution depot at the nearby Europark. This suggests that much higher water levels prevailed on the Levels at the time.

== The church ==
The parish church is dedicated to St. Mary, with the minister historically being also the minister for Llanmartin. The only ministers not appearing also as ministers there were Peter Ameline, rector of Wilcrick in 1535 and Edmond Jones instituted to Wilcrick on 16 July 1631. After that the names and dates of ministers for both parishes are the same. The church has a bell of 1726 cast by the Evans foundry of Chepstow.

Historian J.A. Bradney describes the church as comprising nave and chancel, with a bell turret at the west end and containing "nothing of interest except an ancient font". The whole edifice was rebuilt in 1860.
