= A History of Monmouthshire from the Coming of the Normans into Wales down to the Present Time =

Work by Sir Joseph Bradney

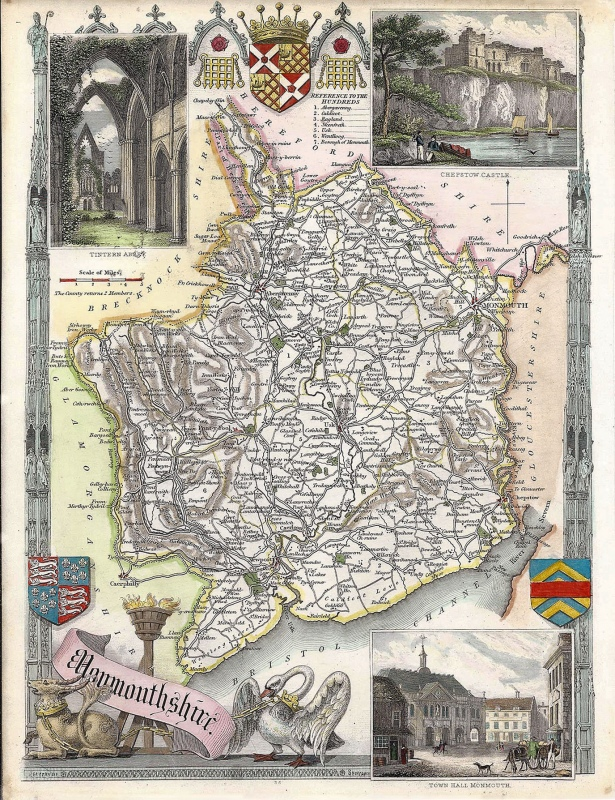
- Thomas Moule's map of the Hundreds of Monmouthshire, 1831
- Composed of: Volume I Part 1, The Hundred of Skenfrith; Volume I Part 2, The Hundred of Abergavenny; Volume II Part 1, The Hundred of Raglan; Volume II Part 2, The Hundred of Trelech; Volume III Part 1, The Hundred of Usk; Volume III Part 2, The Hundred of Usk; Volume IV Part 1, The Hundred of Caldicot; Volume IV Part 2 The Hundred of Caldicot; Four volumes consisting of a List of Subscribers, Addenda and Corrigenda, and Indices of Names and Places
- Author: Colonel Sir Joseph Alfred Bradney, CB DL JP FSA
- Country: United Kingdom
- Language: English
- Genre: History; Genealogy; Architecture
- Publisher: Mitchell, Hughes and Clarke
- Published: 1904-1932
- Media type: Print (hardback)

A History of Monmouthshire from the Coming of the Normans into Wales down to the Present Time is a study of the county of Monmouthshire written by Sir Joseph Bradney and published by Mitchell, Hughes and Clarke of London between 1904 and 1932. The history comprised twelve volumes, based on six of the seven historic hundreds of Monmouthshire; Skenfrith, Abergavenny, Raglan, Trellech, Usk and Caldicot.

== History ==
Colonel Sir Joseph Alfred Bradney (1859 – 1933) was a British soldier, historian and archaeologist. Born in Shropshire, he inherited the Tal-y-coed Court estate and a small fortune at an early age. Settling in Monmouthshire, he held many public offices, as a county councillor, an alderman and as High Sheriff of Monmouthshire in 1889. He was also a governor and a member of the councils of the National Library of Wales and the National Museum of Wales. He devoted much of his time to compiling a history of his adopted county. In the preface to the first volume on the Hundred of Skenfrith, Bradney dedicated his History to Godfrey Morgan, 1st Viscount Tredegar and went on to describe his methodology. This consisted of outline descriptions of many of the places and buildings within the county, together with detailed genealogies of the principal families associated with them. The early volumes also contained many photographs and illustrations, particularly of family crests, although these largely disappeared from the later volumes. By the time he came to complete his last volumes on the Hundred of Caldicot in the early 1930s, Bradney lamented that there were "fewer illustrations and fewer shields of arms than before; my excuse for this is the great cost of this work, and at the same time the diminution in the number of those who are able, owing to financial stress, to purchase expensive books".

== Original arrangement: 1904–1932 ==
Bradney's History comprises twelve volumes, divided by the traditional administrative areas of Hundreds. The work covers six of the seven hundreds of Monmouthshire.

- Volume I Part 1, The Hundred of Skenfrith, (1904)
- Volume I Part 2, The Hundred of Abergavenny, (1906)
- Volume II Part 1, The Hundred of Raglan, (1911)
- Volume II Part 2, The Hundred of Trelech, (1913)
- Volume III Part 1, The Hundred of Usk, (1921)
- Volume III Part 2, The Hundred of Usk, (1923)
- Volume IV Part 1, The Hundred of Caldicot, (1929)
- Volume IV Part 2, The Hundred of Caldicot, (1932)
- Four volumes consisting of a List of Subscribers, Addenda and Corrigenda, and Indices of Names and Places.

== Revised arrangement: 1991-1994 ==
Between 1991 and 1994 the history was reprinted by Academy Books, and subsequently the Merton Priory Press, as an 80% sized facsimile. The work was arranged somewhat differently to the original history, the indexes were included in their respective Parts, and a fifth volume covering the last Hundred of Newport, was compiled from Bradney's manuscript notes by Dr Madeleine Gray. This last volume was published by the National Library of Wales. The re-ordered works were:

- Volume 1 Part 1, The Hundred of Skenfrith, (1991),
- Volume 1 Part 2a, The Hundred of Abergavenny, (1992),
- Volume 1 Part 2b, The Hundred of Abergavenny, (1992),
- Volume 2 Part 1, The Hundred of Raglan, (1992),
- Volume 2 Part 2, The Hundred of Trelech, (1992),
- Volume 3 Part 1, The Hundred of Usk, (1993),
- Volume 3 Part 2, The Hundred of Usk, (1993),
- Volume 4 Part 1, The Hundred of Caldicot, (1994),
- Volume 4 Part 2 The Hundred of Caldicot, (1994),
- Volume 5 The Hundred of Newport, (1993),

== Assessment ==
Bradney's work remains a valuable source for information on the county's history but its weaknesses have long been recognised. The architectural historian John Newman, writing in his Gwent/Monmouthshire Pevsner, noted that "Bradney's approach, with its emphasis on genealogies and monumental inscriptions, was out-of-date in its own day; but his pages are full of clues and cannot be ignored". His family histories came in for particular criticism. Sir Cyril Fox and Lord Raglan, in the first of their three-volume study Monmouthshire Houses, wrote of the pedigrees of the Monmouthshire families; "Sir Joseph Bradney gives a large number (which) trace their ancestry to Welsh kings or Norman lords but are, like those of their English contemporaries, mostly fictitious". Canon E.T. Davies, in his 1986 study, Bradney's "History of Monmouthshire": An Assessment, placed Bradney in a "particular tradition in which country gentlemen wrote for country gentlemen". Considering him more of a genealogist than a historian, Davies levelled two particular charges: his reliance on weak sources for his early history of the county, such as Geoffrey of Monmouth, and Iolo Morganwg, who had been exposed as a forger while Bradney was engaged on his work; and his lack of interest in, and coverage of, Monmouthshire's later industrial history; "his vision fixed on the old, historic, agricultural Monmouthshire..., the inadequate treatment of a new industrial society emphasised a fatal weakness in Bradney's history". In the Glamorgan-Gwent Archaeological Trust survey, Gwent Historic Churches carried out for Cadw in 1997, E. M. Evans noted that Bradney's lack of architectural training and understanding limited the value of his works, while appreciating his "transciptions of funerary monuments, some of which no longer survive". Despite its deficiencies, Bradney's industry and the sheer scale of his investigative work continue to be recognised; the historian of Gwent, Raymond Howell, writing in 1988, praised his "monumental efforts of half a century ago". Twenty years later, in his foreword to the second volume of the Gwent County History, The Age of the Marcher Lords, c.1070-1536, Martin Culliford acknowledged the debt to Bradney, and to William Coxe, when paying tribute to the contributors to the history; "[they] are no longer just following in the hallowed footsteps of Archdeacon Coxe and Sir Joseph Bradney but by now have overtaken them".

== Sources ==
- Bradney, Joseph Alfred (1904). The Hundred of Skenfrith. A History of Monmouthshire from the Coming of the Normans into Wales down to the Present Time Volume 1, Part 1. Mitchell, Hughes and Clarke. OCLC 896129125.
- — (1906). The Hundred of Abergavenny. A History of Monmouthshire from the Coming of the Normans into Wales down to the Present Time Volume 1, Part 2. Mitchell, Hughes and Clarke. OCLC 895940655.
- — (1911). The Hundred of Raglan. A History of Monmouthshire from the Coming of the Normans into Wales down to the Present Time Volume 2, Part 1. Mitchell, Hughes and Clarke. OCLC 895940653.
- — (1913). The Hundred of Trelech. A History of Monmouthshire from the Coming of the Normans into Wales down to the Present Time Volume 2, Part 2. Mitchell, Hughes and Clarke. OCLC 895939552.
- — (1921). The Hundred of Usk, first part. A History of Monmouthshire from the Coming of the Normans into Wales down to the Present Time Volume=3, Part 1. Mitchell, Hughes and Clarke. OCLC 502610834.
- — (1923). The Hundred of Usk, second part. A history of Monmouthshire from the Coming of the Normans into Wales down to the Present Time Volume=3, Part 2. Mitchell, Hughes and Clarke. OCLC 502610826.
- — (1929). The Hundred of Caldicot, first part. A History of Monmouthshire from the Coming of the Normans into Wales down to the Present Time Volume 4, Part 1. Mitchell, Hughes and Clarke. OCLC 896116356.
- — (1932). The Hundred of Caldicot, second part. A History of Monmouthshire from the Coming of the Normans into Wales down to the Present Time Volume 4, Part 2. Mitchell, Hughes and Clarke. OCLC 502610829.
- — (1904–1933). List of Subscribers, Addenda and Corrigenda, and Indices of Names and Places, four parts. A History of Monmouthshire from the Coming of the Normans into Wales down to the Present Time. Mitchell, Hughes and Clarke. OCLC 884485215.
- — (1991a). The Hundred of Skenfrith. A History of Monmouthshire from the Coming of the Normans into Wales down to the Present Time Volume 1, Part 1. Academy Books. ISBN 9781873361092. OCLC 59882270.
- — (1991b). The Hundred of Abergavenny, first part. A History of Monmouthshire from the Coming of the Normans into Wales down to the Present Time Volume 1, Part 2a. Academy Books. ISBN 9781873361122. OCLC 896118883.
- — (1992a). The Hundred of Abergavenny, second part. A History of Monmouthshire from the Coming of the Normans into Wales down to the Present Time Volume 1, Part 2b. Academy Books. ISBN 9781873361139. OCLC 60103879.
- — (1992b). The Hundred of Raglan. A History of Monmouthshire from the Coming of the Normans into Wales down to the Present Time Volume 2, Part 1. Academy Books. ISBN 9781873361153. OCLC 59890882.
- — (1992c). The Hundred of Trelech. A History of Monmouthshire from the Coming of the Normans into Wales down to the Present Time Volume 2, Part 2. Academy Books. ISBN 9781873361160. OCLC 59924501.
- — (1993a). The Hundred of Usk, first part. A History of Monmouthshire from the Coming of the Normans into Wales down to the Present Time Volume 3, Part 1. Academy Books. ISBN 9781873361177. OCLC 896118895.
- — (1993b). The Hundred of Usk, second part. A History of Monmouthshire from the Coming of the Normans into Wales down to the Present Time Volume 3, Part 2. Merton Priory Press. ISBN 9780952000938. OCLC 896061723.
- — (1994a). The Hundred of Caldicot, first part. A History of Monmouthshire from the Coming of the Normans into Wales down to the Present Time Volume 4, Part 1. Merton Priory. ISBN 9781873361160. OCLC 59814982.
- — (1994b). The Hundred of Caldicot, second part. A History of Monmouthshire from the Coming of the Normans into Wales down to the Present Time Volume 4, Part 2. Merton Priory Press. ISBN 9780952000952. OCLC 896061771.
- — (1993c). Gray, Madeleine (ed.). The Hundred of Newport. A History of Monmouthshire from the Coming of the Normans into Wales down to the Present Time Volume 5. Cardiff/Aberystwyth: South Wales Record Society/National Library of Wales. ISBN 9780950867670. OCLC 82421105.
- Culliford, Martin (2008). Griffiths, Ralph A.; Hopkins, Tony; Howell, Ray (eds.). The Age of the Marcher Lords, c.1070-1536. The Gwent County History. Vol. 2. Cardiff: University of Wales Press. ISBN 978-0-70-832072-3. OCLC 836831938.
- Davies, E.T. (1986). Bradney's "History of Monmouthshire": An Assessment. Abergavenny, Monmouthshire: Regional Publications. ISBN 0906570212. OCLC 17776795.
- Evans, E. M. (1997). Gwent Historic Churches Survey (PDF). Swansea: Glamorgan-Gwent Archaeological Trust.
- Fox, Cyril; Raglan, Lord (1994). Medieval Houses. Monmouthshire Houses. Vol. 1. Cardiff: Merton Priory Press Ltd & The National Museum of Wales. ISBN 9780720003963. OCLC 916186124.
- Howell, Raymond (1988). A History of Gwent. Llandysul, Ceredigion: Gomer Press. ISBN 9780863833380. OCLC 19268836.
- Newman, John (2000). "Further Reading". Gwent/Monmouthshire. The Buildings of Wales. London: Penguin. ISBN 0-14-071053-1.
