= Kingdom of Gwent =

Kingdom in South Wales

Kingdom of Gwent Teyrnas Gwent (Old Welsh)
- 5th century–c. 1075 (intermittently in union with Glywysing/in Morgannwg)
- Coat of arms

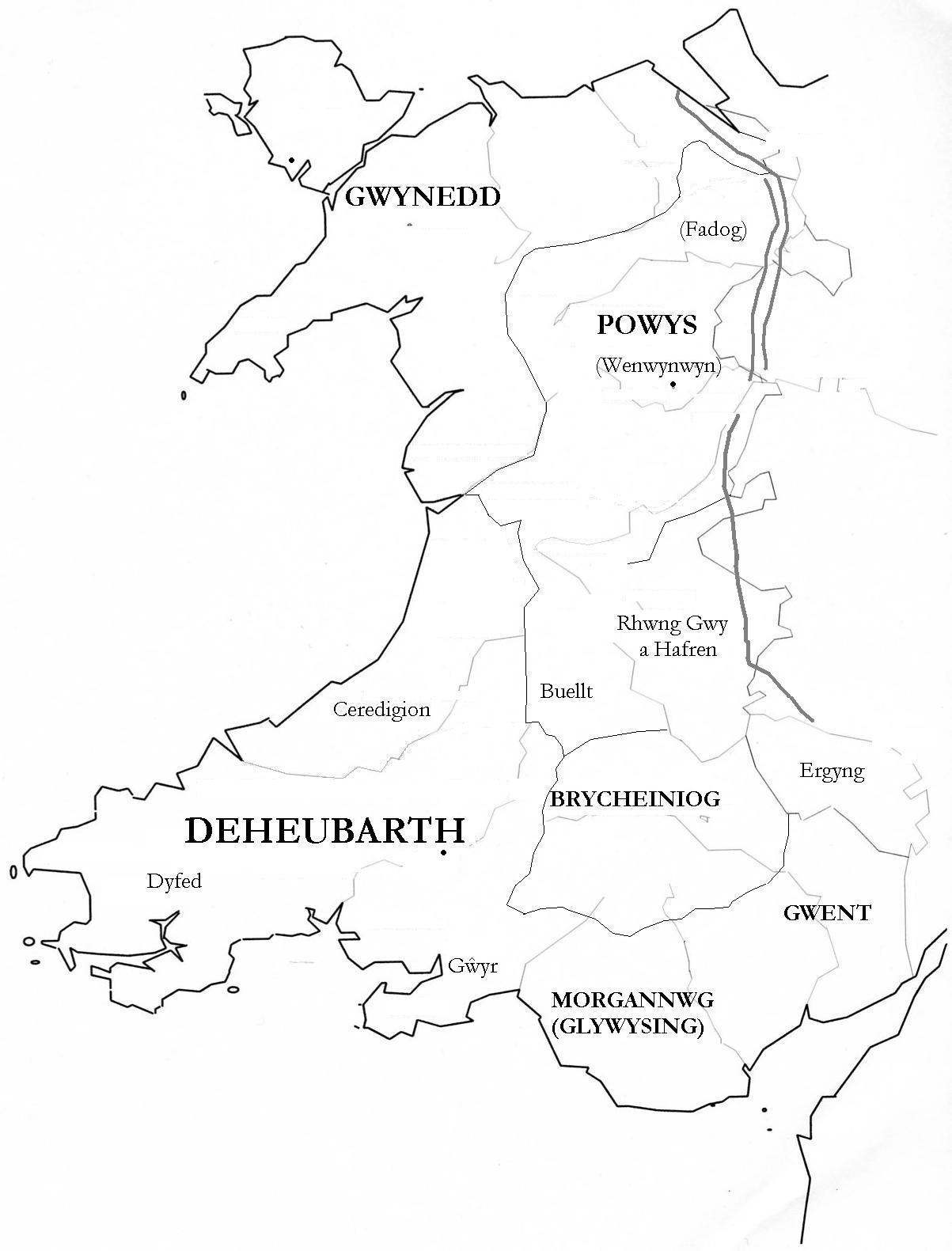
- Medieval kingdoms of Wales, showing Gwent in the south-east
- Capital: Caerwent; Porth-is-Coed
- Common languages: Old Welsh
- Religion: Celtic Christianity
- Government: Monarchy
- Historical era: Middle Ages
  - Formed after Roman withdrawal from Britain: 5th century
  - Various unions with Glywysing: 6th century-c. 745
  - Union in Morgannwg (under Morgan Hen ab Owain): 942–974
  - Union as part of Wales (under Gruffydd ap Llywelyn, King of Wales): c. 1055-1063
  - Union in Morgannwg: 1063-1074
  - Norman conquest: 1070-1090
Preceded by	Succeeded by
Roman Britain; Kingdom of Morgannwg	Kingdom of Morgannwg; Welsh Marches
- Today part of: United Kingdom; ∟Wales

Gwent (Old Welsh: Guent) was a medieval Welsh kingdom, lying between the Rivers Wye and Usk. It existed from the end of Roman rule in Britain in about the 5th century until the Norman invasion of Wales in the 11th century. Along with its neighbour Glywysing, it seems to have had a great deal of cultural continuity with the earlier Silures, keeping their own courts and diocese separate from the rest of Wales until their conquest by Gruffydd ap Llywelyn. Although it recovered its independence after his death in 1063, Gwent was the first of the Welsh kingdoms to be overrun following the Norman conquest.

== History ==
=== Establishment ===
The area has been occupied since the Paleolithic, with Mesolithic finds at Goldcliff and evidence of growing activity throughout the Bronze and Iron Age.

Gwent came into being after the Romans had left Britain, and was a successor state drawing on the culture of the pre-Roman Silures tribe and ultimately a large part of their Iron Age territories. It took its name from the civitas capital of Venta Silurum, perhaps meaning "Market of the Silures". In the post Roman period, the territory around Venta became the successor kingdom of Guenta, later Gwent, deriving its name directly from the town through the normal sound change in the Brythonic languages from v to gu. The town itself became Caerwent, "Fort Venta".

=== Early Gwent ===
According to one Old Welsh genealogy, the founder of the kingdom was Caradoc Freichfras. The earliest centre of the kingdom may have been at Caerwent, the Roman administrative centre, or perhaps Caerleon, formerly a major Roman military base. Welsh saints like Dubricius, Tatheus and Cadoc Christianized the area from the 5th century onwards. According to tradition, in about the 6th century Caradoc moved his court from Caerwent to Portskewett, perhaps meaning nearby Sudbrook. Other suggestions are that Gwent was founded by Erb, possibly a descendant of Caradoc, who may have been a ruler of Ergyng east of the Black Mountains who won control of a wider area to the south.

A later monarch was the Christian King Tewdrig who was mortally wounded repelling a pagan Saxon invasion. From the 6th century, various kings would unite the kingdom of Gwent with Glywysing to the west, with Tewdrig's son Meurig doing so through marriage. It has been suggested that Meurig's son, Athrwys, may be the origin for King Arthur, although others consider this unlikely.

=== Morgannwg ===
In 931, Morgan ab Owain of Gwent, later known as Morgan Hen (Morgan the Old), was one of the Welsh rulers who submitted to Athelstan's overlordship, and attended him at court in Hereford. However, Gwent remained a distinct Welsh kingdom. In about 942, Gwent and Glywysing were again temporarily united under the name Morgannŵg by Morgan Hen, but they were broken up again after his death. In 1034 Gwent was invaded by Canute.

=== Destruction ===
Gwent's existence as a separate kingdom again temporarily ended when Gruffydd ap Llywelyn won control of the area and Morgannŵg in 1055, so extending his rule over the whole of Wales. In 1056 Gruffyd ap Llywelyn campaigned from the vicinity of Monmouth with an army of Welsh, Saxons and Danes to defeat Ralph, Earl of Hereford, ravaging the surrounding countryside. However, after Gruffydd's death in 1063, Caradog ap Gruffudd re-established an independent kingdom in Gwent under his father's 2nd cousin Cadwgan ap Meurig. In 1065 the area was invaded by Earl Harold of Hereford, who attempted to establish a base at Portskewett, but it was razed to the ground by Caradog, and Harold - having by then been crowned King of England - was killed at the Battle of Hastings the following year.

With the Norman invasion of Britain, the Normans sacked south-east Wales and parts of Gwent in response to Eadric's Herefordshire rebellion in alliance with the Welsh prince of Gwynedd (and Powys), Bleddyn ap Cynfyn. King Maredudd of Deheubarth decided not to resist the Norman encroachment on Gwent and was rewarded with lands in England in 1070, at the same time as the chronicler Orderic Vitalis noted in his Historia Ecclesiastica that a Welsh king named "Caducan" (Cadwgan ap Meurig) suffered defeat in battle at the hands of William FitzOsbern, 1st Earl of Hereford. With the Norman invasion of Wales extending westwards, Caradog's area of control moved into Deheubarth to the west, and in 1074 Caradog took over control over what was left of the war-ravaged Kingdom from Cadwgan ap Meurig.

=== Norman Lordships ===
By Caradog's death in 1081 most of Gwent had become firmly under Norman control. The Normans divided the area, including those areas which they controlled beyond the River Usk, into the Marcher Lordships of Abergavenny, Caerleon, Monmouth, Striguil (Chepstow) and Usk. Welsh law as seen through Norman eyes continued, with Marcher lords ruling sicut regale ("like a king") as stated by Gilbert, Earl of Gloucester.

The Normans lords freely built permanent stone castles, many originating from a network of earlier motte and bailey castles. The density of castles of this type and age is amongst the highest in Britain and certainly the rest of the Welsh Marches, with at least 25 castle sites remaining in Monmouthshire alone today.

Conflict with the Welsh continued intermittently, although the Welsh Lord of Caerleon, Morgan ab Owain, grandson of King Caradog ap Gruffudd, was recognized by Henry II c. 1155, with Caerleon remaining, in Welsh hands, subject to occasional struggles, until William Marshal retook the castle in 1217 from Morgan ap Hywel.

== Extent ==
While the kingdom's northern and southern borders were unchanging (confirmed by the Severn Sea and the Brecon Beacons), the kingdom is variously described as bordering the rivers Wye or Severn in the East, and the Rhymney or Usk in the West. The kingdom's territory is best demonstrated by its subdivisions, the ancient commotes and cantrefi defined in medieval Welsh law. At its greatest extent, the kingdom of Gwent is said to have consistent of four Cantrefi:

- Gwent Uch-coed (or Uwchcoed)
- Gwent Is-coed
- Gwynllŵg, the western most cantref between the Rhymney and Usk (traditionally regarded as part of the kingdom of Glywysing)
- Cantref Coch, the eastern most cantref between the Wye and Severn (today it is the Forest of Dean in Gloucestershire)

In the early post-Roman period, the later commotes of Ergyng and Ewyas were both kingdoms in their own right. However both kingdoms would lose power, eventually falling entirely under the control of the Kingdom of Gwent.

According to William of Malmesbury, Æthelstan met with the Welsh kings at Hereford in 926 where the border between the Kingdom of Gwent and the Kingdom of England was agreed at the Wye, removing Cantref Coch from Gwent's historic boundaries. (Note: William of Malmesbury's report of the Hereford meeting is not mentioned in the first volume of the Oxford History of Wales, Wales and the Britons 350–1064 by Thomas Charles-Edwards.) The later county of Monmouthshire was made up of the kingdom's two remaining cantrefs, Gwent Uch-coed and Gwent Is-coed. In 1542, these were subdivided into the six hundreds of Abergavenny, Caldicot, Raglan, Skenfrith, Usk and Wentloog.

== Legacy ==
Despite the extinction of the kingdom by 1091, the name Gwent remained in use for the area by the Welsh throughout this period and later centuries. It was traditionally divided by the forested hills of Wentwood (Welsh: Coed Gwent) into Gwent Uwch-coed ("beyond the wood") and Gwent Is-coed ("below the wood"). These terms were translated into English as Overwent and Netherwent, the entire area sometimes being known as "Wentland" or "Gwentland".

The Marcher Lordships were the basic units of administration for the next 450 or so years, until Henry VIII passed the Laws in Wales Act 1535. This Act abolished the Marcher Lordships and established the County of Monmouth, combining the Lordships east of the Usk with Newport (Gwynllŵg or Wentloog) and Caerleon to the west of it.

In the 19th and 20th centuries, writers again began using the name 'Gwent' in a romantic literary way to describe Monmouthshire. In the local government re-organisations of 1974/5, several new administrative areas within Wales were named after medieval kingdoms - Gwent, Dyfed, Powys, and Gwynedd. Gwent as a local government unit again ceased to exist in 1996, when replaced by the unitary local authorities of Newport, Blaenau Gwent, Torfaen, Caerphilly (which included parts of Mid Glamorgan), and Monmouthshire. The name remains as one of the preserved counties of Wales used for certain ceremonial purposes, and also survives in various titles, e.g. Gwent Police, Royal Gwent Hospital and Coleg Gwent.
