= Monmouthshire (historic) =

Historic county in Wales

Coordinates: 51°40′N 3°00′W

Monmouthshire Sir Fynwy (Welsh)
- Historic county
- 1536–1974
- Flag adopted in 2011

- Area
  - 1831: 324,310 acres (1,312.4 km^{2})
  - 1901: 345,048 acres (1,396.36 km^{2})
  - 1961: 339,088 acres (1,372.24 km^{2})
- Population
  - 1831: 98,130
  - 1901: 230,806
  - 1961: 444,679
- Density
  - 1831: 0.3/acre
  - 1901: 0.7/acre
  - 1961: 1.3/acre
- Status: Ceremonial county (until 1974); Non-administrative county (1536–1889); Administrative county (1889–1974); Historic county (non-administrative)
- Chapman code: MON
- Government: Monmouthshire County Council (1889–1974); Newport County Borough Council (1891–1974); Cardiff County Borough Council (part) (1938–1974)
  - HQ: Monmouth and Newport
  - Motto: Faithful to both (Utrique Fidelis)
- Coat of arms of Monmouthshire County Council
- History
  - Established by the Laws in Wales Act 1535: 1536
  - Disestablished: 1974
Succeeded by
County of Gwent
Mid Glamorgan
South Glamorgan

Monmouthshire (/ˈmɒnməθʃər, ˈmʌn-, -ʃɪər/ MON-məth-shər, MUN-, -sheer), also formerly known as the County of Monmouth (/ˈmɒnməθ, ˈmʌn-/ MON-məth, MUN-; Welsh: Sir Fynwy), was one of the thirteen counties of Wales that existed from 1536 until their abolition in 1974. Located in the south-east of Wales, on the border with England, its area now corresponds approximately to the present principal areas of Monmouthshire, Blaenau Gwent, Newport and Torfaen, and those parts of Caerphilly and Cardiff east of the Rhymney River.

The eastern part of the county was mainly agricultural, while the western valleys had rich mineral resources. This led to the area becoming highly industrialised with coal mining and iron working being major employers from the 18th century to the late 20th century. Its five largest towns were Newport, Cwmbran, Pontypool, Ebbw Vale and Abergavenny.

Monmouthshire's Welsh status was ambiguous between the 16th and 20th centuries, with it sometimes considered to be part of England during this time, such in as the Local Government Act 1933; its legal inclusion in Wales was clarified by the Local Government Act 1972, the same act that changed the structure of local government within the county.

== History ==
=== Formation ===
The "county or shire of Monmouth" was formed from parts of the Welsh Marches by the Laws in Wales Act 1535. According to the Act the shire consisted of all Honours, Lordships, Castles, Manors, Lands, Tenements and Hereditaments, lying or being within the Compass or Precinct of the following Lordships, Townships, Parishes, Commotes and Cantrefs... in the Country of Wales:

Monmouth • Chepstow • Matherne (Mathern) • Llanvihangel (Llanfihangel Rogiet) • Magour (Magor) • Goldcliffe (Goldcliff) • Newport • Wentlooge • Llanwerne (Llanwern) • Caerlion (Caerleon) • Usk • Treleck (Trellech) • Tintern • Skenfrith • Grosmont • Witecastle (White Castle) • Raglan • Calicote (Caldicot) • Biston (Bishton) • Abergavenny • Penrose (Penrhos) • Grenefield (Maesglas) • Maghen (Machen) • Hochuyslade (possessions of Llanthony Priory)

The Act also designated Monmouth as the "Head and Shire town of the said county or shire of Monmouth", and ordered that the Sheriff's county or shire court be held alternately in Monmouth and Newport.

=== Boundaries and subdivisions ===
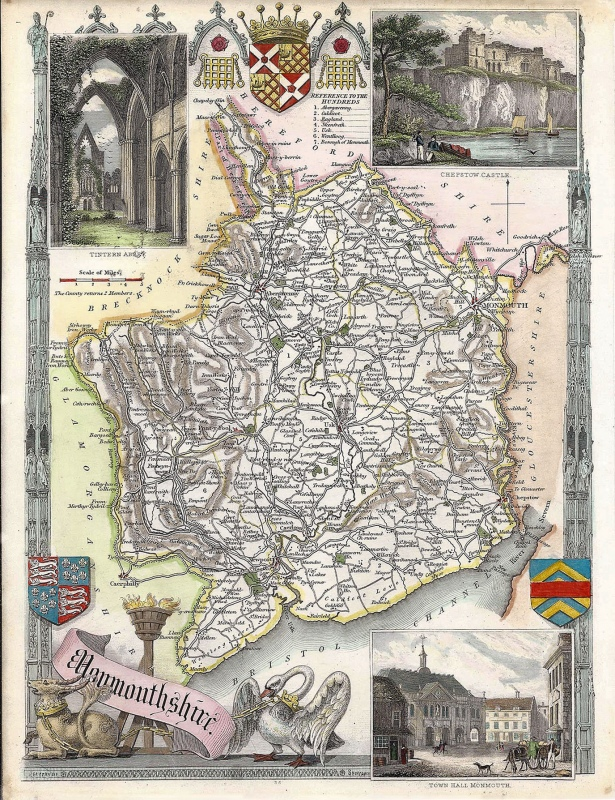
Map of the hundreds of Monmouthshire by Thomas Moule, c. 1831

The county boundaries are the River Wye on the east, dividing it from Gloucestershire and the Rhymney River to the west dividing it from Glamorganshire, with the Bristol Channel to the south. The boundaries with Herefordshire to the northeast and Brecknockshire to the north were less well-defined. The parish of Welsh Bicknor, was an exclave of Monmouthshire, sandwiched between Gloucestershire and Herefordshire. The area was considered part of Monmouthshire until it was made part of Herefordshire "for all purposes" by the Counties (Detached Parts) Act 1844, while the Herefordshire hamlet of Fwthog (or Ffwddog) adjoining the Honddu Valley remained an exclave within Monmouthshire until 1891.

The county was divided into six hundreds in 1542: Abergavenny, Caldicot, Raglan, Skenfrith, Usk and Wentloog.

The county contained the three boroughs of Monmouth, Newport and Usk.

==== Civil parishes ====
In the medieval period Monmouthshire was divided into the following civil parishes, listed by hundred (chapelries in italics):

Hundred	Parishes
Abergavenny	Abergavenny • Aberystruth • Cwmyoy (Llanthony) • Goytre • Llanddewi Rhydderch • Llanddewi Skirrid • Llanellen • Llanfair Kilgeddin • Llanfoist • Llangattock Lingoed • Llangattock nigh Usk • Llanhilleth • Llanover • Llansantffraed • Llantilio Pertholey (Bettws) • Llanvapley • Llanvetherine • Llanvihangel Crucorney • Llanvihangel Gobion • Llanwenarth • Mamhilad • Oldcastle • Trevethin
Caldicott	Bishton • Caerwent • Caldicot • Chepstow • Christchurch • Goldcliff • Ifton • Itton • Langstone (Cat's Ash) • Llanfihangel Rogiet • Llanmartin • Llanvaches • Llanvair Discoed • Llanwern • Magor (Redwick) • Mathern • Mounton • Nash • Newchurch • Penhow • Penterry • Portskewett • Rogiet • St Arvans • St Brides Netherwent • St Pierre • Shirenewton • Sudbrook • Undy • Whitson • Wilcrick
Ragland	Bettws Newydd • Bryngwyn • Cwmcarvan • Dingestow • Kilgwrrwg • Llanarth • Llandenny • Llandogo • Llanfihangel Tor-y-mynydd • Llangovan • Llanishen • Llansoy • Mitchel Troy • Penallt • Penrhos • Pen-y-clawdd • Raglan • Tintern Parva (Tintern St Mary) • Tregare • Trellech (Trellech Grange) • Wolvesnewton
Skenfrith	Dixton • Grosmont • Llangattock Vibon Avel (Llanfaenor) • Llangua • Llantilio Crossenny • Llanvihangel Ystern Llewern • Monmouth (Overmonnow) • Rockfield • St Maughans • Skenfrith • Welsh Bicknor • Wonastow
Usk	Gwernesney • Kemeys Commander • Kemeys Inferior • Llanbadoc • Llanddewi Fach • Llandegveth • Llanfihangel Llantarnam • Llanfihangel Pontymoile • Llanfrechfa • Llangattock juxta Caerleon • Llangeview • Llangwm (Llandevaud • Llangwm Isaf) • Llangybi • Llanhennock • Llanllowell • Llantrisant • Monkswood^{1} • Panteg • Tredunnock • Trostrey • Usk
Wentlooge	Bassaleg • Bedwas • Bedwellty • Bettws • Coedkernew • Henllys • Machen • Malpas • Marshfield • Michaelston-y-Fedw • Mynyddislwyn • Newport • Peterstone • Risca • Rumney • St Brides Wentloog • St Mellons

^{1}extra-parochial, but still had its own church

=== Municipal reform ===
Monmouth and Newport were reformed as municipal boroughs with elected town councils by the Municipal Corporations Act 1835. Usk continued as an unreformed borough until its final abolition in 1886.

New forms of local government were established in the urban areas of the county with the setting of local boards under the Public Health Act 1848 and Local Government Act 1858. The Public Health Act 1875 divided the rural areas into rural sanitary districts.

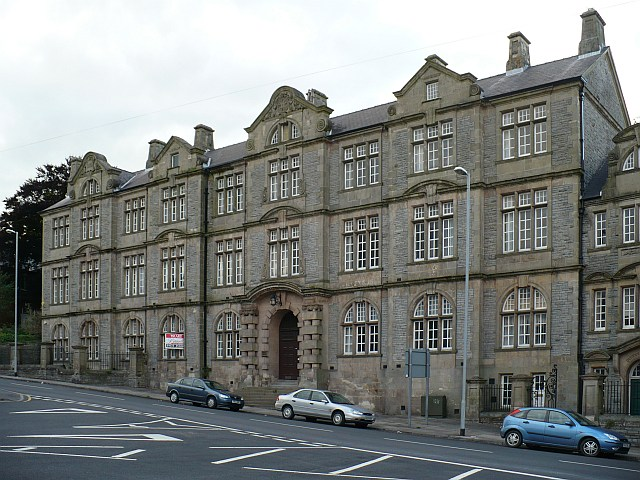
The Shire Hall, Newport

An administrative county of Monmouthshire, governed by an elected county council, was formed in 1889 under the terms of the Local Government Act 1888. The act directed that where urban sanitary districts straddled county boundaries they should be placed entirely in the administrative county which had the majority of the urban sanitary district's population. Along the boundary between Monmouthshire and Brecknockshire were four urban sanitary districts which straddled the county boundary: Brynmawr, Ebbw Vale, Rhymney, and Tredegar. The majority of Brynmawr's population was in Brecknockshire, and so the southern parts of Brynmawr within Monmouthshire were transferred to the administrative county of Brecknockshire. For the other three urban sanitary districts the majority of the population was in Monmouthshire, which therefore gained from Brecknockshire the Beaufort and Rassau areas of Ebbw Vale, the Dukestown area of Tredegar, and the Llechryd area of Rhymney.

The county council was based in Newport, rather than the historic county town of Monmouth. In 1891 the borough of Newport achieved county borough status and therefore left the administrative county, although the administration of the county council continued to be based at Shire Hall, Newport. In the same year the parish of Fwthog was transferred to both the administrative and geographic county of Monmouthshire.

Under the Local Government Act 1894, the administrative county was divided into urban and rural districts, based on existing sanitary districts.

Municipal boroughs	Monmouth
Urban districts	Abercarn • Abergavenny • Abersychan • Abertillery • Bedwellty • Blaenavon • Caerleon • Chepstow • Ebbw Vale • Llanfrechfa Upper • Llantarnam • Nantyglo and Blaina • Panteg • Pontypool • Rhymney • Risca • Tredegar • Usk
Rural districts	Abergavenny • Chepstow • Magor • Monmouth • Pontypool • St Mellons

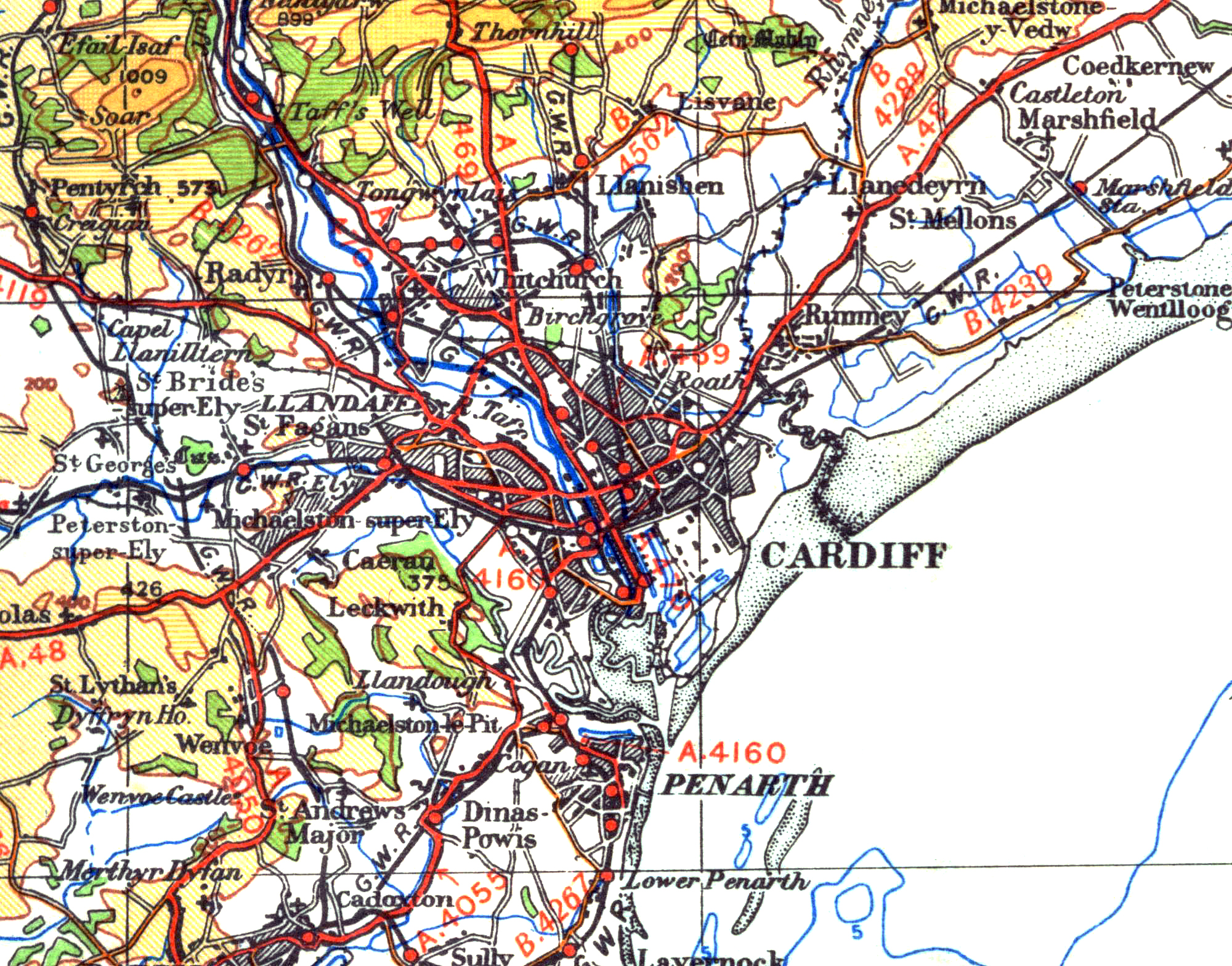
1946 OS map showing Monmouthshire/Glamorgan and border running along the Rhymney River

In 1899 Abergavenny was incorporated as a borough. Two further urban districts were formed: Mynyddislwyn in 1903, and Bedwas and Machen in 1912. The County of Monmouth Review Order 1935 revised the number and boundaries of the urban and rural districts in the administrative county. A new Cwmbran urban district was formed by the abolition of Llanfrechfa Upper and Llantarnam UDs, Abersychan and Panteg UDs were absorbed by Pontypool urban district, and Magor and St Mellons RD was formed by a merger of two rural districts.

The county boundaries provided the basis of the boundaries of the new Diocese of Monmouth, created in October 1921 following the disestablishment of the Church in Wales from the Church of England in April 1920. The Diocese covered all of the County of Monmouthshire but also included the Parish of Cyncoed in north-east Cardiff, a situation which continues in 2023.

The last major boundary change to affect the administrative county came in 1938 when the Monmouthshire parish of Rumney was incorporated into the city and county borough of Cardiff. However, the geographical Monmouthshire/Glamorgan and England/Wales border remained the Rhymney River.

=== Local government reform ===
The administrative county of Monmouth and county borough of Newport were abolished in 1974 under the Local Government Act 1972. The successor authority, with minor boundary changes, was titled Gwent. Some border parishes became part of the new Rhymney Valley district of Mid Glamorgan or the Cardiff district of South Glamorgan.

== Ambiguity over status ==
=== Background ===
The historic county covers an area roughly contiguous with the medieval Kingdom of Gwent's core cantrefi of Gwent Uch-coed (Upper Gwent), Gwent Is-coed (Lower Gwent), and Gwynllŵg.

Gwent became part of the Kingdom of Morgannwg in the 10th century, and part of the unified Kingdom of Wales under Gruffydd ap Llywelyn. Following the Norman invasion of Wales, Monmouthshire was subject to the Marcher Lords, and was not subject to English law. Following the Acts of Union the land which is today called Monmouthshire was undisputedly in Wales.

=== The 16th to 19th centuries ===
The Laws in Wales Act 1535 (27 Hen. 8. c. 26) integrated Wales directly into the English legal system and the "Lordships Marchers within the said Country or Dominion of Wales" were allocated to existing and new shires. Some lordships were annexed to existing counties in England and some were annexed to existing counties in Wales, with the remainder being divided up into new counties, one of which was Monmouthshire.

Although the original Laws in Wales Act 1535 specifically includes Monmouthshire as being in the "Country or Dominion of Wales", the Laws in Wales Act 1542 (34 & 35 Hen. 8. c. 26) enumerates the Welsh counties as twelve in number, omitting Monmouthshire from the count. Monmouthshire was made directly responsible to the courts of Westminster rather than falling under the Court of Great Sessions in Wales. According to historian John Davies, this arrangement was the origin of the belief that the county had been annexed by England rather than remaining part of Wales. Davies disagrees, and says, "Monmouthshire was no less Welsh in language and sentiment than any other eastern county". Moreover the belief that Monmouthshire was somehow specially annexed to England is not consistent with the wording in the Act "That his said Country or Dominion of Wales shall be, stand and continue for ever from henceforth incorporated, united and annexed to and with this his Realm of England", making it clear that the whole of Wales was being "annexed" to England, not just Monmouthshire.

Despite Monmouthshire being a new county, it was given two knights of the shire in common with existing counties in England, rather than one as in the counties in Wales. The relevant section of the act states that "one Knight shall be chosen and elected to the same Parliaments for every of the Shires of Brecknock, Radnor, Montgomery and Denbigh, and for every other Shire within the said Country of Dominion of Wales". However, it was given only one borough member, like the other Welsh counties (apart from Pembrokeshire which had two Borough members and Merioneth which had none). In ecclesiastical terms, most of the county outside the town of Monmouth itself remained within the Diocese of Llandaff; the town of Monmouth was in the diocese of Hereford, while the parishes of Cwmyoy and Llanthony were in the Diocese of St Davids. In 1549 Edward VI granted a Charter to Monmouth which was described as being "in the Marches of Wales". Later writers who described Monmouthshire as being in Wales included Humphrey Llwyd (History of Cambria, 1568); Thomas Churchyard (Worthiness of Wales, 1587); and Michael Drayton (Poly-Olbion, 1613).

In the late 17th century, under Charles II, Monmouthshire was added to the Oxford circuit of the English assizes following which, according to the 1911 Encyclopædia Britannica, it gradually "came to be regarded as an English county". The Modern Universal British Traveller of 1779 stated: "Monmouthshire was formerly a part of Wales, and continued so till the reign of Charles II, when it was reckoned an English county (as it has been ever since) because the judges then began to keep the assizes here in the Oxford circuit." A later traveller, George Borrow in 1862, wrote: "Monmouthshire is at present considered an English county, though certainly with little reason, for it not only stands on the western side of the Wye, but the names of almost all its parishes are Welsh, and many thousands of its population still speak the Welsh language."

Although Wales was legally integrated into England, the word "England" was still taken to exclude Wales in many contexts. The Wales and Berwick Act 1746 ensured that "in all Cases where the Kingdom of England, or that Part of Great Britain called England, hath been or shall be mentioned in any Act of Parliament, the same has been and shall from henceforth be deemed and taken to comprehend and include the Dominion of Wales and Town of Berwick upon Tweed".

The eastern part of the county is mainly agricultural, while the western valleys had rich mineral resources. This led to the area becoming highly industrialised with coal mining and iron working being major employers from the 18th century to the late 20th century.

=== "Wales and Monmouthshire" ===
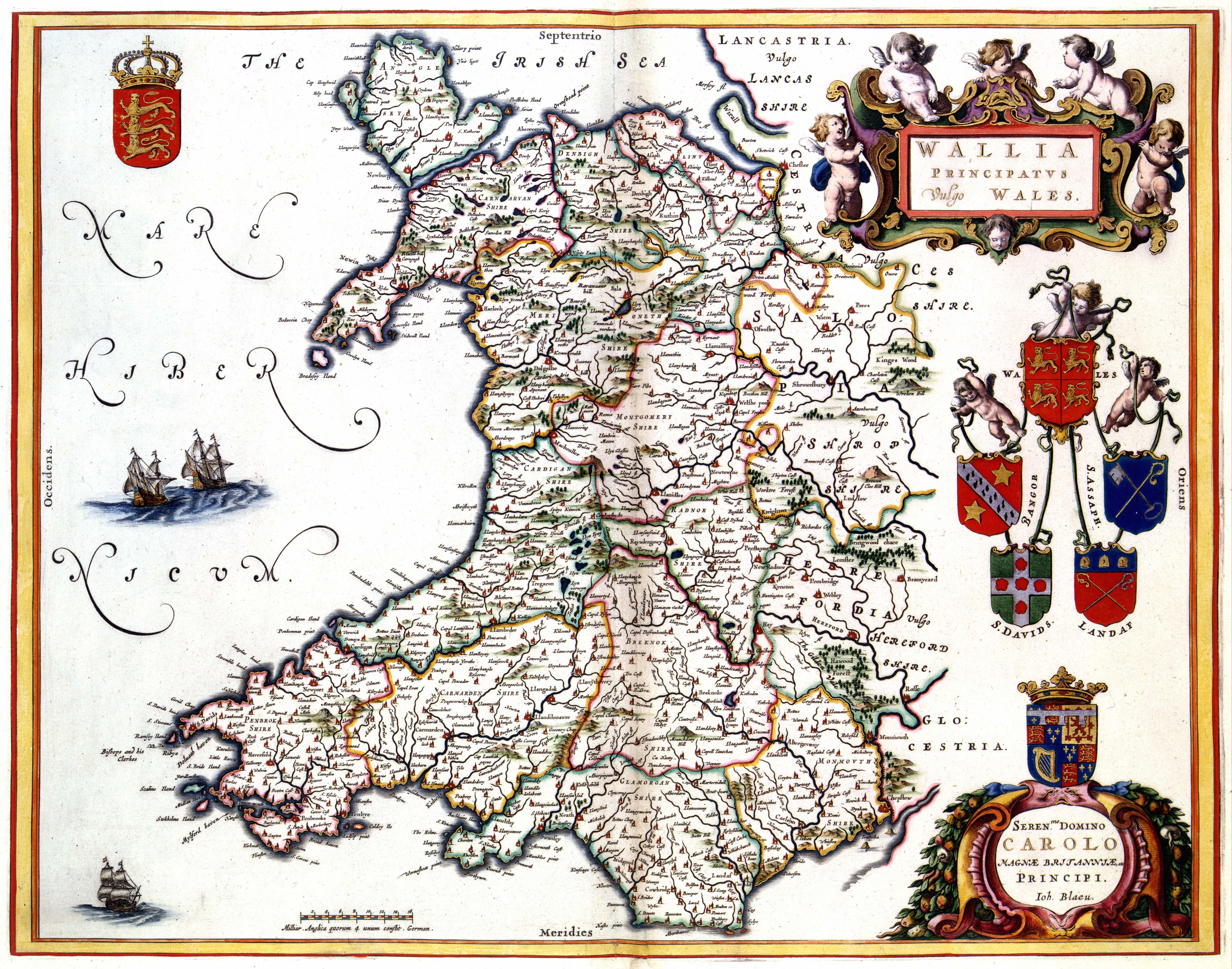
Joan Blaeu's map of Wales in 1645, which includes Monmouthshire

The 1911 Encyclopædia Britannica unambiguously described the county as part of England, but notes that "whenever an act [...] is intended to apply to [Wales] alone, then Wales is always coupled with Monmouthshire". However, most Acts of Parliament listed Monmouthshire as part of England; for example, the Local Government Act 1933 listed both the administrative county of Monmouth and county borough of Newport as part of England. In the rare event that an Act of Parliament was restricted to Wales, Monmouthshire was usually included, in the format "Wales and Monmouthshire"; for example, although the Sunday Closing (Wales) Act 1881 did not apply to Monmouthshire, the creation of the Welsh Office in 1965 and the Welsh Language Act 1967 did (although the latter had the paradoxical effect of reinforcing the legal connection of Monmouthshire with England: see next section). The Welsh Intermediate Education Act 1889 also applied to Monmouthshire. The Sunday Closing Act was also extended to Monmouthshire in 1915 under wartime legislation. In considering the Sunday Closing Act in 1921, Monmouthshire County Council resolved, with only one vote against, to request that the county should be included in Wales for all legislative purposes. Another typical example was the division of England and Wales into registration areas in the 19th century — one of which, the "Welsh Division", was defined as including "Monmouthshire, South Wales and North Wales".

According to Chris Williams of Cardiff University:

The problem with Monmouthshire is that it was located not on, strictly speaking, a national frontier, but within a single political formation. This had been the case since the Acts of Union of 1536 and 1543 which had extended the English system of justice, government and parliamentary representation to the principality of Wales and the March. From the mid-sixteenth century to the early nineteenth century it had not been a matter of very much importance as to whether an England/Wales border could be identified and, if so, where it ran in respect of Monmouthshire. That situation changed in the nineteenth century, as the particular cultural, linguistic and political characteristics of Welsh society emerged as both a problem (for the British state) and as a cause (particularly among Welsh Liberals and nonconformists). Once specific policies (be they considered corrective or emancipating) began to be designed for application to Wales, then the question of Monmouthshire's placement became important.

It has been suggested that the question of the status of Monmouthshire arose in earnest in the 19th century, when some of the local gentry such as the Dukes of Beaufort established family seats in England, and many industrialists and others moved into Monmouthshire, particularly in the eastern part of the county. Some of these, and others with "social aspirations", considered it essential to emphasise their "Englishness", and there were attempts to refine the notion that anomalies in the 16th-century legislation had made the county non-Welsh. The distinction implied in the description "Wales and Monmouthshire" was nurtured by elements of the establishment, and became increasingly accepted on the English side of the border and in central government, until the local Welsh residents more fully asserted themselves in the 20th century.

=== Twentieth-century debate ===
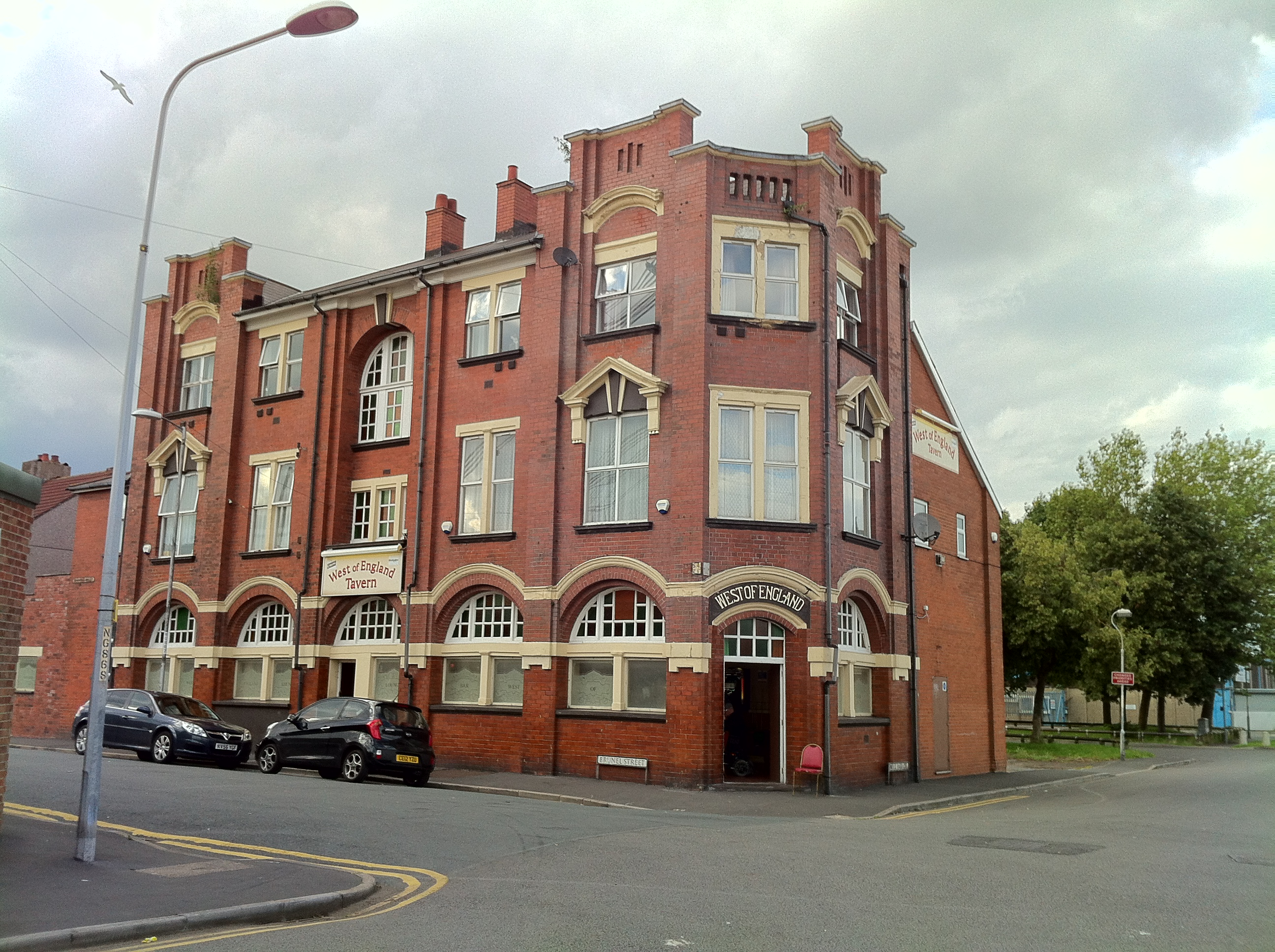
The West of England Tavern in Newport

Following the Welsh Church Act 1914, the Church in Wales was set up in 1920, containing within it the Diocese of Llandaff which included almost all of Monmouthshire. The new Diocese of Monmouth was formed in 1921. In Anglican terms, the area thus came to be treated as part of Wales.

The question of Monmouthshire's status continued to be a matter of discussion, especially as Welsh nationalism and devolution climbed the political agenda in the 20th century. This sometimes led to heated debates in Parliament. In 1921 the Earl of Plymouth objected strongly to the inclusion of the county in legislation forcing the closing of public houses in Wales on Sundays. "I stand as strongly as I can for the privileges of Monmouthshire, to say it is a county of England." He went on to complain that Welsh representatives were imposing the ban "against the will of the people of Monmouthshire". The extension of the legislation to Monmouthshire was confirmed by Parliament despite a petition of over 77,000 names against Sunday closing.

In 1937, the Lord Lieutenant of Monmouthshire, Sir Henry Mather-Jackson, stated: "Monmouthshire is not in Wales... We are in England, and I am not going to be added to Wales for any purpose whatsoever". During a debate on the Administration of Justice (Miscellaneous Provisions) Bill in 1938, Lord Raglan objected to the stipulation that the chairman of the Monmouthshire quarter sessions should be a Welsh-speaker. Raglan stated that "The County of Monmouth is an English county. I do not think that will be disputed.." and he claimed that Welsh nationalists had attempted to convince the Lord Chief Justice to move Monmouthshire from the Oxford Circuit to the South Wales Circuit, thereby making it part of Wales in matters of court administration. He alleged that these "persons unconnected with Monmouthshire" had claimed incorrectly that the inhabitants of the county "spoke nothing but Welsh".

In 1948, Monmouthshire County Council was granted a coat of arms with the motto Utrique fidelis ("Faithful to both"), to reflect the dual loyalties of the area. Increasingly in legislation, "the state was prepared to treat Monmouthshire as if it were part of Wales, even if it was not able to concede that legally it was Welsh." In 1949, Monmouthshire was included within the remit of the Council for Wales and Monmouthshire, an appointed body established by the Government to advise on Welsh affairs and a precursor of the Welsh Office. Treating Monmouthshire as part of Wales in legislation occasionally created further anomalies. For example, the Historic Buildings and Ancient Monuments Act 1953 contained the provision that "For the purposes of this Act the administrative county of Monmouth shall be taken to be part of Wales and not part of England." This left the county borough of Newport as part of England but treated the rest of the county as part of Wales.

The Member of Parliament (MP) for Abertillery, Llywelyn Williams, campaigned to have Monmouthshire unambiguously placed in Wales. Speaking in the House of Commons in February 1957 he said "I think that it is about time we dropped this Wales and Monmouthshire business. Apart from a few cranks who search the files of the distant past for some very flimsy tokens of evidence to suggest that Monmouthshire belongs to England, no person acquainted with the county — its history, customs, place names, culture and way of life — would dream of regarding Monmouthshire people as anything but Welsh." Later in the year he asked Henry Brooke, Minister of Housing and Local Government and Welsh Affairs, "whether he will now remove from official documents and records relating to Wales the additional words 'and Monmouthshire', since Monmouthshire is included in the term Wales.". Brooke replied in the negative, as he did not think "such a course would be consistent with various statutory provisions relating to Monmouthshire."

The Local Government Commission for Wales established in 1958 included Monmouthshire within its review area, and in 1961 proposed merging the area into a new "South East Wales" county. The proposed inclusion of Monmouthshire in Wales infuriated Lord Raglan, by now Lord Lieutenant of the county. In reaction, a "Make Monmouthshire Welsh" campaign was launched in August 1961 to gain parliamentary recognition that the county was in Wales. In November 1961 it was announced that a branch of the Royal Society of St George was to be formed, emphasising the county's English identity. Another group, the "Monmouthshire is Welsh" society, was formed and was supported by local MPs Michael Foot and Leo Abse. Two years later Monmouth Borough Council made representations to the Minister of Housing and Local Government seeking the transfer of the town to Herefordshire in the event that the reforms were carried out. Signs erected by Monmouthshire County Council welcoming motorists to Wales were defaced or removed. The County Council placed a revised sign at Monmouth stating "Welcome to Wales and Monmouthshire"; first, the words "..and Monmouthshire" were painted over, and then the words "..to Wales" were also obliterated.

The Welsh Office, established in 1965, included Monmouthshire within its remit. The Wales and Berwick Act was repealed in regard to Wales in 1967 by the Welsh Language Act 1967, which however also continued to use the phrase "Wales and Monmouthshire". The Interpretation Act 1978 hence provides that in legislation passed between 1967 and 1974, "a reference to England includes Berwick upon Tweed and Monmouthshire".

=== Clarification of position in Wales ===
In 1969 George Thomas, Secretary of State for Wales proposed to fully incorporate Monmouthshire into Wales. Lord Raglan (son of the former lord lieutenant), asked the following question in the House of Lords: "To ask Her Majesty's Government why they propose to incorporate Monmouthshire into Wales without consulting Monmouthshire's inhabitants." Replying for the government, Baroness Phillips stated that "The purpose of the change is to remove the anomaly arising from the present need to refer to Monmouthshire separately from Wales in Statutes. My right honourable friend the Secretary of State believes that the proposal commands wide support in the county." In April of the following year Plaid Cymru MP Gwynfor Evans asked Thomas "when he proposes to implement his undertaking that the phrase 'Wales and Monmouthshire' " will be dropped." The Secretary of State indicated that it would be after the passing of legislation to reform local government in Wales.

The issue was finally clarified in law by the Local Government Act 1972, which provided that "in every act passed on or after 1 April 1974, and in every instrument made on or after that date under any enactment (whether before, on or after that date) "Wales", subject to any alterations of boundaries..." included "the administrative county of Monmouthshire and the county borough of Newport".

Debate on the relevant amendment, Clause 256, took place late on 20 July 1972, with few local MPs present. The Minister of State, David Gibson-Watt, agreed to a question from George Thomas that "...in future the argument about Monmouthshire being part of Wales is over, and that [his] statement makes it clear that Monmouthshire is part of Wales for good and for ever?" Raymond Gower said that the statement was "quite consistent with the fact that towns with names such as Abergavenny and Llantarnam could not be anything other than Welsh"; it was opposed by Gerald Kaufman, who stated: "Am I to take it that an act of annexation of this magnitude is to be carried through a sparsely attended House of Commons on the nod at five minutes to midnight on the same basis as Europe has annexed England? I wish to voice my protest."

== Legacy ==
The name "Monmouthshire" was revived for one of the principal areas created on further local government reorganisation in 1996. The principal area covers only part of the historic county, which also included Newport, Torfaen, most of Blaenau Gwent, and parts of Caerphilly and Cardiff.

The preserved county of Gwent, which still exists for some ceremonial purposes, is similar in extent to historic Monmouthshire with the addition of the west bank of the Rhymney Valley.

== See also ==
- List of Lord Lieutenants of Monmouthshire
- List of Sheriffs of Monmouthshire
- Custos Rotulorum of Monmouthshire – List of Keepers of the Rolls
- Monmouthshire (UK Parliament constituency) – Historical list of MPs for the constituency of Monmouthshire
- Geology of Monmouthshire – describes the geological history of the historic county
