= St Bridget's Church, St Brides Wentlooge =

Coordinates: 51.5351°N 3.0216°W

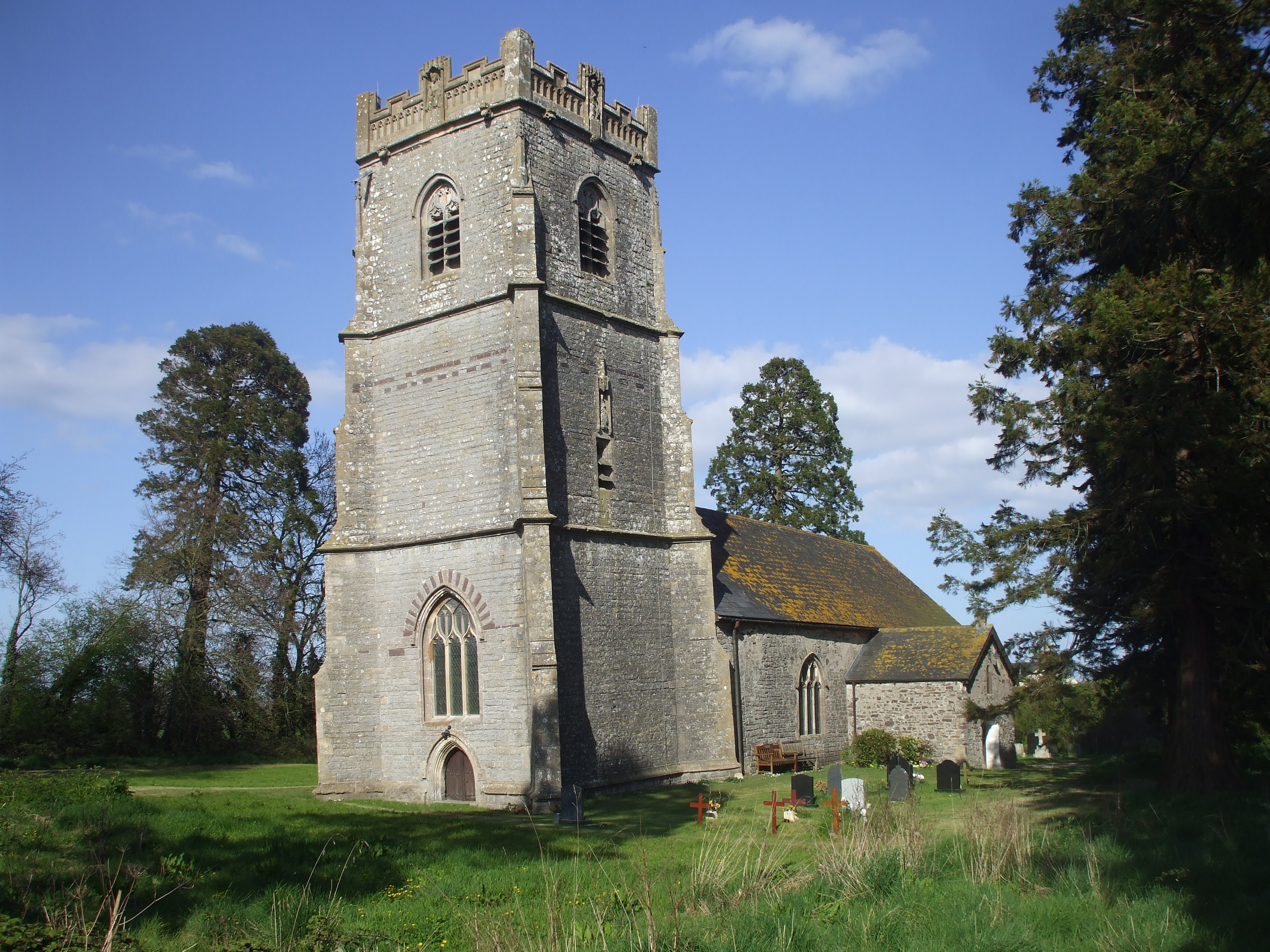

- Location in Newport
- OS grid reference: ST 292 822
- Location: St. Brides Wentloog, Newport
- Country: Wales
- Denomination: Church in Wales
- Website: Mountain and Marsh Ministry

Architecture
- Functional status: Active
- Heritage designation: Grade II*
- Designated: 1 March 1963
- Architectural type: Church

Specifications
- Materials: Stone, slate roof

St Bridget's Church stands in the village of St Brides, Wentlooge, to the west of the city of Newport, Wales. It is an active parish church and a Grade II* listed building.

== History and description ==
The date of the church's foundation is uncertain. The Royal Commission on the Ancient and Historical Monuments of Wales (RCAHMW) suggests its origins were as a chapel in the 14th century. It was largely rebuilt in the 15th century, and was restored again in the 19th. It is dedicated to St Brigid. A plaque within the church records the 1607 Bristol Channel floods, a feature common to churches in the area.

St Bridget's is an active parish church within the Mountain and Marsh Ministry Area, which covers the area between Newport and Cardiff, from the Wentloog Level on the Severn estuary in the south to Caerphilly in the north. Services are held weekly.

The church is designed in the Perpendicular Gothic style. It is constructed of local rubble stone, including limestone and sandstone. It is a Grade II* listed building. Its churchyard cross is recorded on the RCAHMW Coflein database.
