= Abergavenny Hundred =

Historical division of Monmouthshire, Wales

Abergavenny
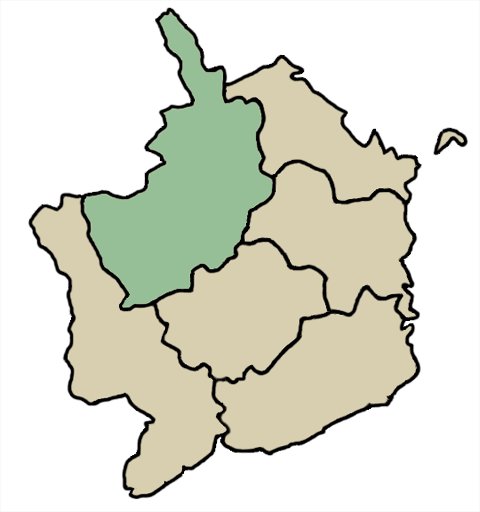
- Abergavenny within Monmouthshire
- Area
  - 1831: 78,290 acres (316.8 km^{2})
- Population
  - 1851: 50,086
  - 1861: 54,742
- History
  - Created: 1542
- Status: hundred
- Subdivisions
  - Type: Divisions
  - Units: Higher and Lower

Abergavenny was an ancient hundred of Monmouthshire.

It was situated in the northern part of the county, bounded on the north by Herefordshire; on the east by the hundreds of Skenfrith, Raglan, and Usk; on the south by Wentloog hundred; and on the west by Wentloog and Brecknockshire.

It contained the following ancient parishes:

- Abergavenny
- Abersychan
- Abertillery
- Crucornau Fawr
- Cwmyoy
- Goetre Fawr
- Llanarth
- Llanfoist
- Llanddewi Rhydderch
- Llandewi Skirrid
- Llantilio Pertholey
- Llanellen
- Llanfable
- Llanfair Kilgeddin
- Llanfferrin
- Llanfihangel Crucorney
- Llangatwg Dyffryn Wysg
- Llangattock-Lingoed
- Llanhilleth
- Llanover
- Llansaintffraid
- Llanwenarth
- Lloyndu hamlet
- Mamhilad
- Oldcastle
- Trevethin

The administration of the area is now divided between the local authorities of Monmouthshire, Torfaen and Blaenau Gwent. Part is within the area of the Brecon Beacons National Park.
