= Gwynllwg =

Medieval Welsh kingdom, lordship and cantref

Coordinates: 51.685°N 3.154°W

Gwynllŵg was a kingdom of Medieval Wales and later a Norman lordship and then a cantref. It is named after Gwynllyw, its 5th century and 6th century ruler.

== Location ==
The kingdom consisted of coastal plain stretching between the Rhymney and Usk River, together with the hills to the north, consisting of the commotes of Magor and Machen, respectively. It was traditionally regarded as a sub-kingdom of the kingdom of Glamorgan (Welsh: Morgannwg) to its west, rather than that of Gwent, which began east of the River Usk. However, under the Laws in Wales Acts of 1535–42, the cantref was included with those situated to the east, to form the new county of Monmouthshire.

== Wentloog and St. Woolos ==
The name Gwynllŵg became a marcher lordship (alternatively called Newport). The name survives as 'Wentloog' in the Wentloog hundred and in villages on the coastal plain such as Peterstone Wentloog and St Brides Wentloog. The name Pillgwenlly for a district of central Newport also contains a corrupted version of this name. The Caldicot and Wentloog Levels also take their name from the hundred.

The Cathedral at Newport is dedicated to Gwynllyw (corrupted to St. Woolos). The name survives as 'St. Woolos' as the general locality around the cathedral.
