= E. T. Davies =

Welsh scholar and priest (1903–1991)

Ebenezer Thomas Davies (1903–1991), who was known as E. T., was born in Pontycymer, Glamorgan in South East Wales He was a schoolmaster and scholar-priest in the Church in Wales. He obtained a First Class Honours degree in history at Cardiff University, after which he taught history at Pontycymwr Grammar School in the Garw valley. While there he met Winifred Thomas, a Latin teacher, who he married with whom he had a son and a daughter and three grandsons. He entered the ministry of the Church in Wales in 1936 as a deacon and became a priest in the following year. As a priest he wrote many historical articles and books which were extremely well-received. He remained a priest for the rest of his life.

== Early life and education ==
Davies was born in Pontycymer in Glamorgan. In his adult life he became universally known as E.T.. In 1927 he obtained a first-class honours degree in history at Cardiff University. After graduating, he taught history at Pontycymwr Grammar School in the Garw valley. and at Cardiff while studying for his M.A. degree. While he was teaching at Pontycymwr Grammar School he met Winifred Thomas, a Latin teacher, who he married and to whom he remained married until his death. They had a son and a daughter and three grandsons.

== Ministry ==
Davies became a deacon in the Church in Wales in 1936 and a priest in the following year. He became a curate in the Diocese of Monmouth in Bassaleg (perhaps at the Church of St Basil) and Chepstow, and then became the vicar of Mathern. While in Mathern he wrote a history of the parish, see below under 'Books'. He then became the Rector of Llangybi, in which capacity he wrote, at the request of the Church in Wales Publications, 'The Church in Wales Disestablishment and disendowment', see below under 'Books'.

Davies subsequently fulfilled many roles. He became a rural dean and, in 1953, a canon, and successively a senior canon and an honorary canon. He became the Director of Religious Education for the diocese, and an examining chaplain to the bishops of the Diocese of Monmouth and the Diocese of Swansea and Brecon, the Consultant Archivist to the Representative Body of the Church in Wales; the Examining Chaplain to the Archbishop of Wales, and most notably editor of the Historical Society of the Church in Wales, which position he held until 1973, editing volumes III through XXIV.

== Historical writings ==
Glanmor Williams, the esteemed historian of Wales, paid Davies a fulsome tribute in his obituary of him. Davies was the Honorary Editor of the 'Journal of the Historical Society of the Church in Wales' for more than twenty years. Williams described him in this capacity as being 'an excellent editor: alert, punctilious and efficient' and that there was 'no doubt that he made it one of the leading publications of its kind in the country.'

Williams described Davies' historical writings as having passed through three stages.

During the first phase, Davies had published his first two books, 'The political writings of Richard Hooker' (1948) and 'Episcopacy and the Royal Supremacy (1950), which were derived from the research that he had previously undertaken as a postgraduate student and which Williams described as 'penetrating and thoughtful studies on major themes in British ecclesiastical history.'

During the second stage, Davies undertook research into the history of Monmouthshire and wrote two histories, about its ecclesiastical history (1953), which unfortunately Davies was unable to complete, and on its education and schools (1957), which was informed by the early interest of Davies in and his first-hand experience of education.

During the third stage, Davies wrote what Williams described as his best book, 'Religion in the industrial revolution in South Wales (1965), which began as the Pantyfedwen Trust Lecture for 1962 that Davies had given at University College, Cardiff (now Cardiff University). Williams described his book as being 'of the utmost importance for all those who wish to understand nineteenth-century industrial society in Wales'. Davies followed this book up with his 'Religion and society in the nineteenth century (1981), which Williams observed 'added a number of new and thoughtful suggestions.'

Williams concluded that Davies, a 'sincere Christian and a devoted churchman, 'refused to allow his own deeply held religious convictions to cloud his judgement as an historian.'

== Publications ==
=== Articles ===
- Davies, E.T. (1966). "Jones, Hanes Annibynwyr Cymru (Book Review)". Welsh History Review. 3 (2): 207.
- —— (1974). "The Church of England and schools, 1662-1774". Glamorgan County History. IV: 432-468.
- —— (1976). "The popish plot in Monmouthshire". Journal of the Historical Society of the Church in Wales. XXV: 32-45.
- —— (1977). "The census of religion in Monmouthshire in 1851 (A)". Gwent Local History Journal of the Gwent Local History Council. 42: 38-42.
- —— (1977). "The census of religion in Monmouthshire in 1851 (B)". Gwent Local History. 43: 22-25.
- —— (1978). "The census of religion in Monmouthshire in 1851 (C)". Gwent Local History Journal of the Gwent Local History Council. 44: 14-15.
- —— (1979). "The education of the clergy in the Diocese of Llandaff, 1750-1866". Journal of the Historical Society of the Church in Wales. 26: 54-64.

=== Books ===
- Davies, E.T. (1946). The political ideas of Richard Hooker. London: Society for Promoting Christian Knowledge.
- —— (1950). A history of the parish of Mathern. Chepstow: The Chepstow Society.
- —— (1950). Episcopacy and the Royal Supremacy in the Church of England in the XVI Century. Oxford: Basil Blackwell.
- —— (1953). An ecclesiastical history of Monmouthshire Part 1: Down to the Beginnings of the Reformation. Risca, Monmouthshire: Starsons.
- —— (1953). The Church in Wales in the Eighteenth Century. Welsh Church Congress.
- —— (1957). Monmouthshire Schools and Education to 1870. Newport: Starsons.
- Davies, E.T., ed. (1962). The story of the Church in Glamorgan, 560-1960. London: S.P.C.K.
- Davies, E.T. (1962). "From the Restoration to Disestablishment". In Davies, E.T. (ed.). The story of the Church in Glamorgan, 560-1960. London: S.P.C.K.
- —— (1965). Religion in the Industrial revolution in South Wales (Pantyfedwen Lectures). Cardiff: University of Wales Press.
- —— (1970). Disestablishment and disendowment. Cardiff: Church in Wales Publications.
- —— (1977). A guide to the ancient churches of Gwent. Pontypool: Hughes and Son.
- —— (1978). A guide to the castles of Gwent. Newport: R. H. Johns.
- —— (1981). Religion and society in the nineteenth century (A New History of Wales). Llandybïe, Dyfed: Christopher Davies (Publishers). ISBN 0-7154-0602-7.
- —— (1982). The place names of Gwent. Newport: The Starling Press. ISBN 0903434504.
- —— (1986). Bradney's 'History of Monmouthshire' An assessment. Abergavenny: Regional. ISBN 0906570212.
