= St Michael's Church, Llanfihangel Tor-y-Mynydd =

Church of St Michael, Llanfihangel-tor-y-mynydd
- Church of St Michael
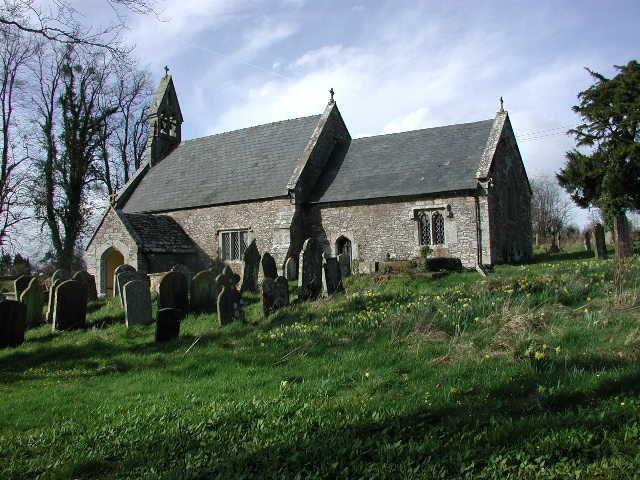
- "an attractive and well preserved medieval church"

- Location in Monmouthshire
- 51.7128°N 2.7772°W
- Location: Llanfihangel-tor-y-mynydd, Monmouthshire
- Country: Wales
- Denomination: Church in Wales

History
- Status: Parish church
- Founded: C14th-C15th century

Architecture
- Functional status: Active
- Heritage designation: Grade II*
- Designated: 19 August 1955
- Architectural type: Church
- Style: Perpendicular

Administration
- Diocese: Monmouth
- Archdeaconry: Monmouth
- Deanery: Monmouth
- Parish: Llanfihangel Tor-y-Mynydd with Llangunnog

Clergy
- Vicar: The Reverend J M Bone

The Church of St Michael, Llanfihangel Tor-y-Mynydd, Monmouthshire is a parish church with its origins in the 14th or 15th century. A Grade II* listed building, the church remains an active parish church.

== History ==
Cadw notes that the interior construction of the Church of St Michael suggests a construction date in the 14th century but nothing now remaining can be dated to earlier than the late 15th century. The church was restored by John Pollard Seddon and John Prichard in 1853–4. The parish of Llanfihangel Tor-y-Mynydd was merged with the parish of Llangunnog in 1902. The church remains an active parish church.

== Architecture and description ==
The church is constructed of Old Red Sandstone rubble with a roof of Welsh slate. The nave and bellcote are part of the Victorian restoration. The font is also by Prichard and Seddon. The building is Grade II* listed as "an attractive and well preserved medieval church".
