= Llandevaud =

Hamlet in Newport, Wales

Coordinates: 51.60826°N 2.86688°W

Llandevaud: Welsh: Llandyfawg
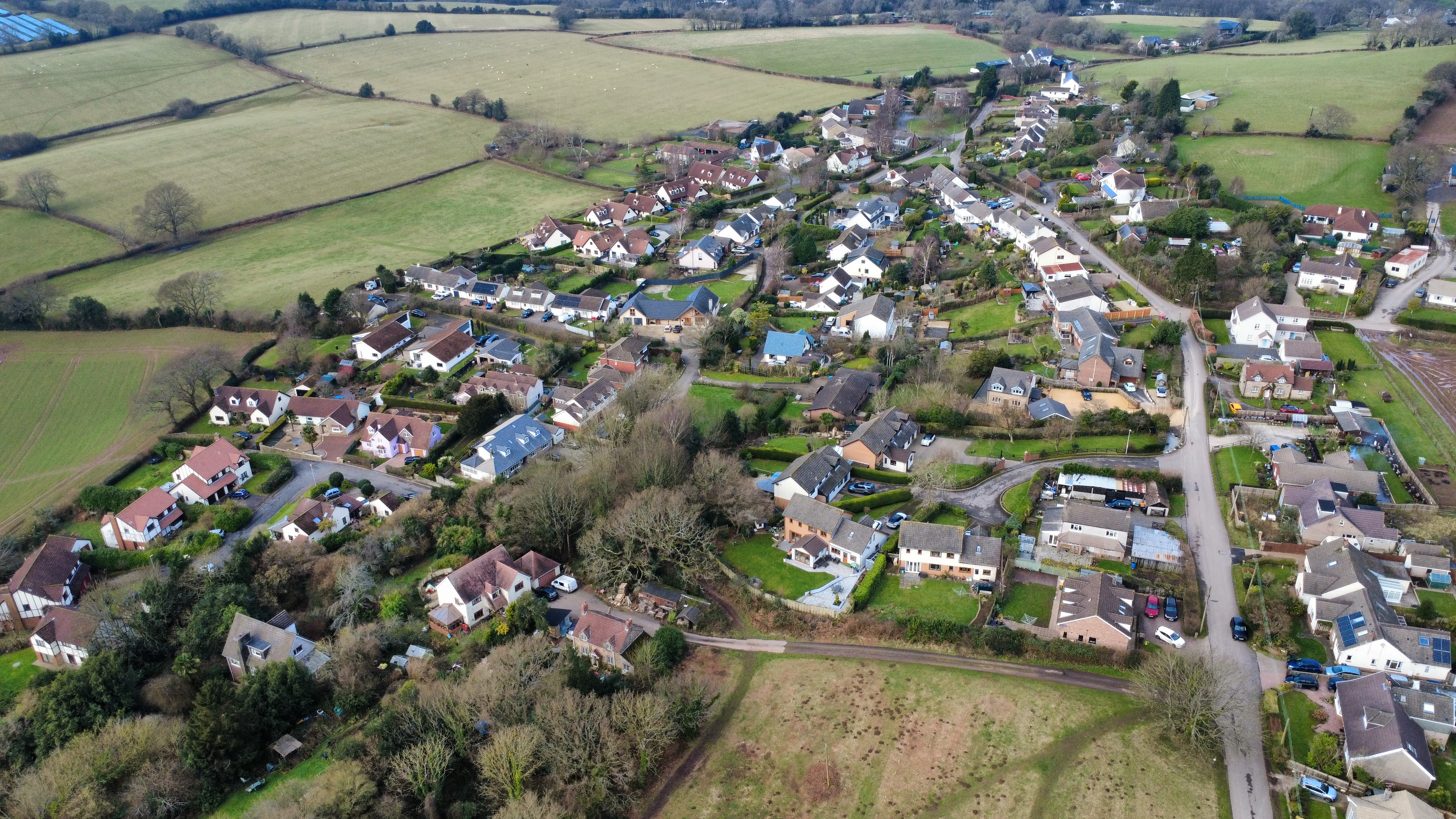
- Llandevaud, looking northwest from 107 metres.

- Location within Newport
- Community: Langstone
- Principal area: Newport
- Country: Wales
- Sovereign state: United Kingdom
- Post town: Newport
- Postcode district: NP18 2
- Police: Gwent
- Fire: South Wales
- Ambulance: Welsh
- UK Parliament: Newport East

Llandevaud (sometimes Welsh: Llandyfawg; also recorded historically in English as Llandevad and Llandevan) is a hamlet in Newport, Wales. It is situated between the A48 Newport-Chepstow Road and the M4 motorway, 1 mile (1.6 km) east of the village of Langstone. It is part of the community of Langstone.

== Geography ==
The western part of the hamlet lies on Brownstones formation sandstone formed between 419.2 and 393.3 million years ago in the Devonian period. The bedrock of the eastern part is the Tintern sandstone formation, formed in the Devonian and Carboniferous periods between 372.2 and 346.7 million years ago. Elevations vary from 30 metres (98 ft) in the northwest by the stream south of the A48 to nearly 90 metres (300 ft) in the east.

== History ==
The derivation of the hamlet name is obscure. Llandevaud Mill is the remains of a post-mediaeval corn mill site at the northwest of the hamlet tithe area by Llanbedr. Two uninvestigated sites are the possible remains of a Roman villa west-southwest of Llandevaud Common and an ancient square cropmark enclosure north of the hamlet near Chepstow Road, of unknown date and function.

In 1831, Llandevaud was part of the Lower Division of the Caldicot Hundred, in the parish of Llanmartin. and the following year in the division of Christchurch, but remained in the parish of Llanmartin.

St. Peter's church is north-northwest of the main hamlet, just off the A48. The original mediaeval church dated from possibly the 13th century. There had also been references to a chapel of rest - Chapel Lane and Chapel Farm are to the east of Upper Road. The current church structure dates from 1843, built on the remains of its predecessor to a design by Edward Haycock, paved with the old tombstones. The church was funded and built through parishioners' efforts and a significant donation from the Commissioners for the Society of Building and Repairing Churches. It was reopened with a service led by Edward Copleston, Bishop of Llandaff, after a 50-year gap without celebrants. Windows include artwork by Henry Holiday, Robert J. Newbery, John Hall & Sons and Celtic Studios. The repaired font is from the original church. The vicar and his family were reportedly very caring and considerate to those in the hamlet. It is now part of the Penhow Group of churches. It is still accessed either from the A48 or from the hamlet by a 640-metre (2,100 ft) public footpath along field edges from Pencoed Lane. In 1993, the Bishop of Monmouth, Rowan Williams, later to become Archbishop of Canterbury, planted a rowan tree near the gate of St. Peter's Church to mark its 150th anniversary.

In 1845, payments by Llandevaud residents in the form of rent to replace the old tithe system were decided upon. Until 1879 (legally), the road from Newport to Chepstow was a turnpike road with tollgates at Newport and the Rock and Fountain Inn at Penhow, 3 kilometres (1.9 miles) east towards Chepstow. The Llandevaud National School building was founded and endowed in 1846 by vicar Lewis Jones (who used his salary towards the repair of St. Peter's) and was expanded at later times, accommodating pupils from surrounding hamlets. A photograph exists of the master and pupils from the late 19th century. It has been a private home since the 1960s.

The Rising Sun Inn by Newport-Chepstow Road served the hamlet through the 19th and 20th centuries, including holding inquests and auctions. Attached to the Inn was a blacksmith's shop, a carpenter's shop and a wheelwright. The Inn was itself auctioned in the 1960s. Thereafter it was called The Foresters' Oaks, a public house and restaurant. It closed as a business in 2014 and again in 2023. It is currently the Three Elephants Indian restaurant.

The dead of Llandevaud in the two world wars are commemorated at the war memorial in Magor. In the late 1990s, plans for the 486-hectare Legend Court scheme, which would have been the UK's biggest theme park, centred on nearby Pencoed Castle and dramatically affecting Llandevaud, were submitted to Monmouthshire and Newport authorities without success.

== Modern hamlet ==
Housing in the hamlet has expanded significantly from the mid-20th century with the former school and other old buildings now used as homes, along with many new bungalows and more substantial structures. Llandevaud Hall is also used as a nursery.

== Government ==
Llandevaud is part of the community of Langstone and locally governed by Langstone Community Council.

Llandevaud is in the ward of Bishton and Langstone of Newport City Council, and statistically part of the 'Langstone 3' area which had a population of 1356 in 2013. Crime and social deprivation indicators for the ward are low. About 30% of households have dependent children and 21% are sole occupiers. Student performance is above average for Newport.

The member of parliament for the area as of 2024 is Jessica Morden of the Labour Party, representing the Newport East constituency.

== Gallery ==
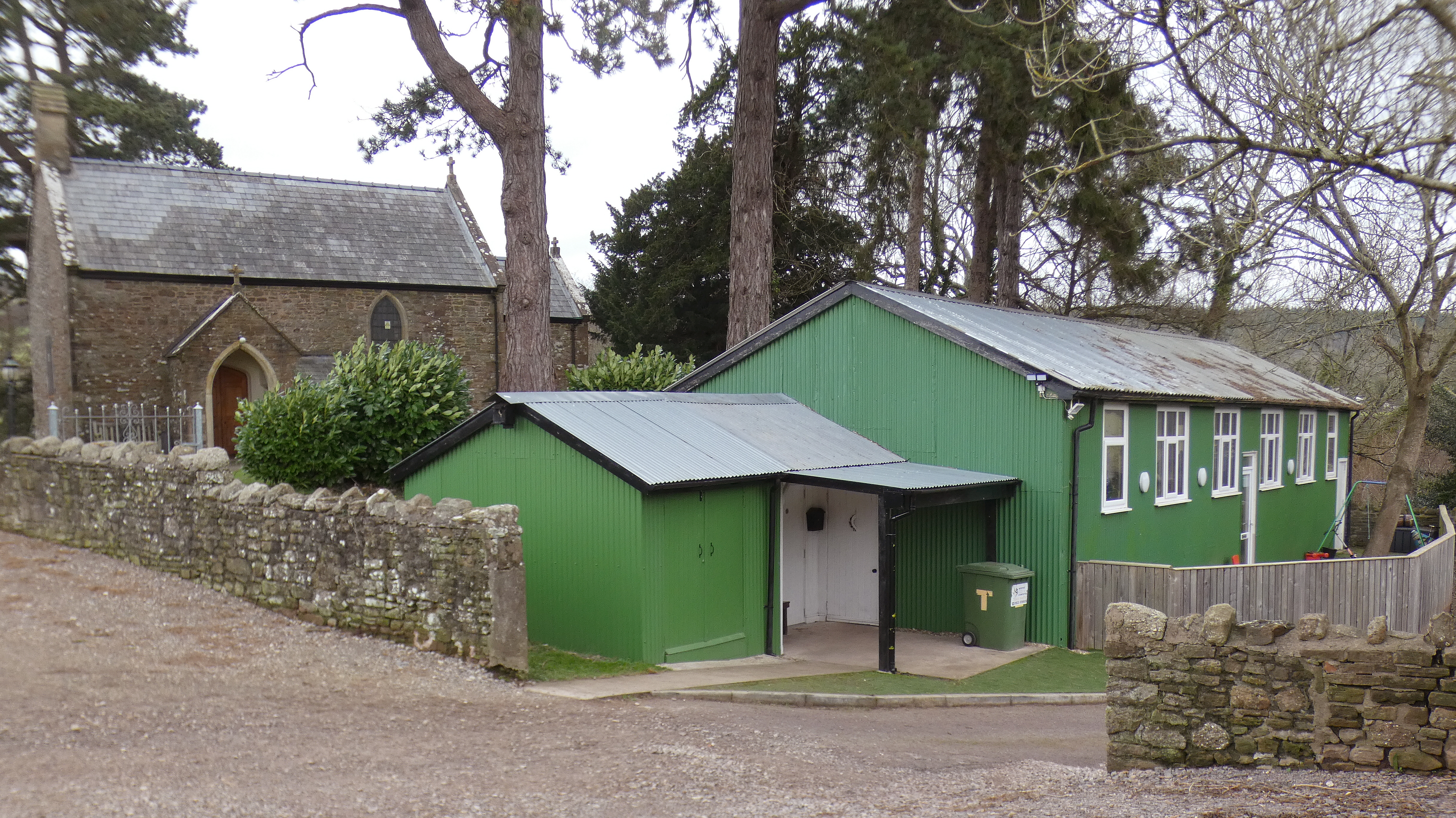
Llandevaud Hall with St. Peter's Church in the background

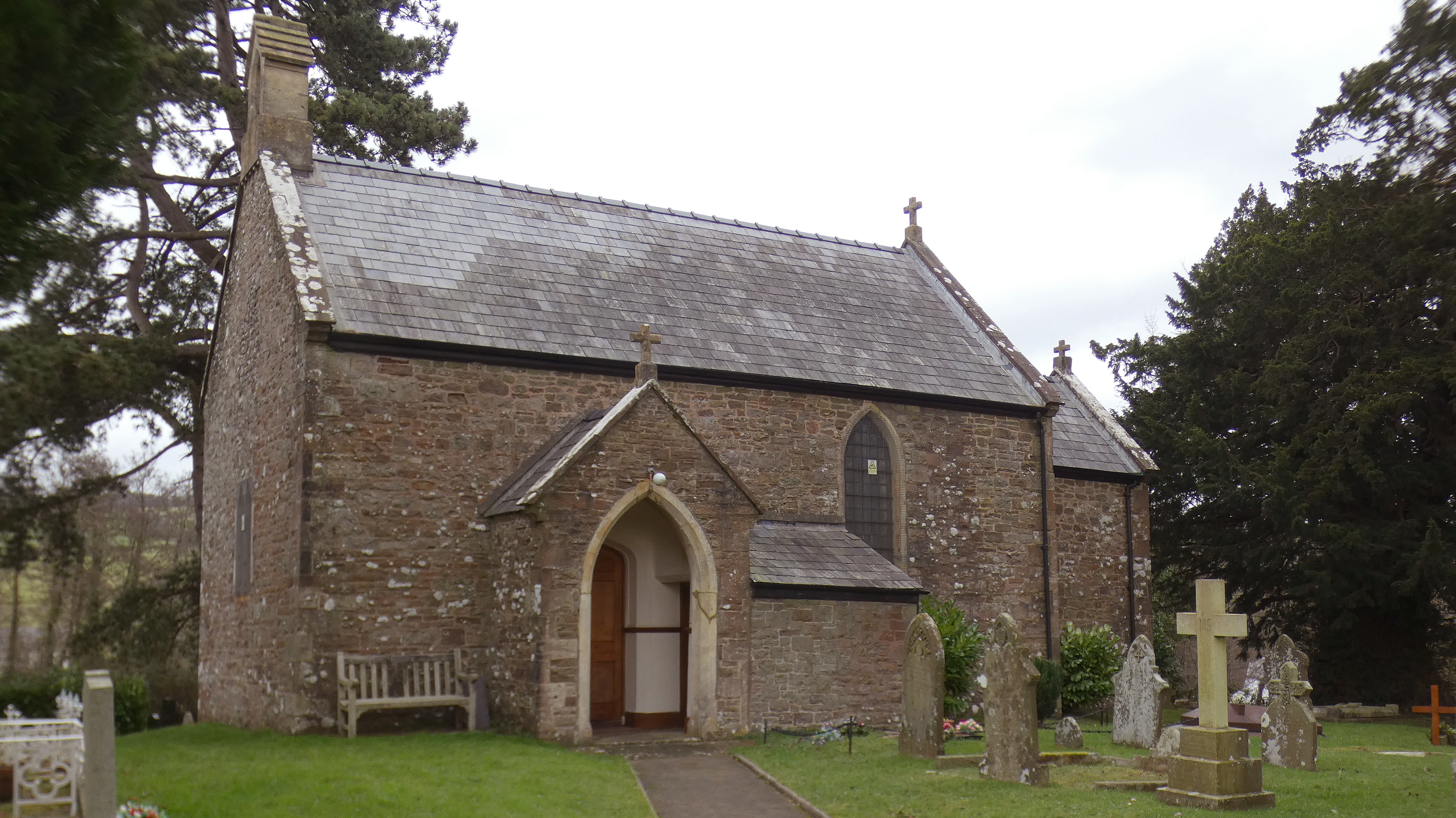
St. Peter's Church, Llandevaud

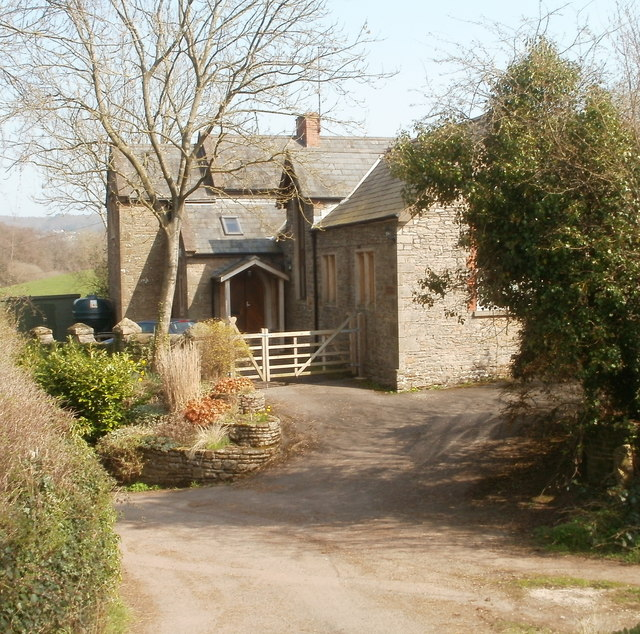
The former Llandevaud National School

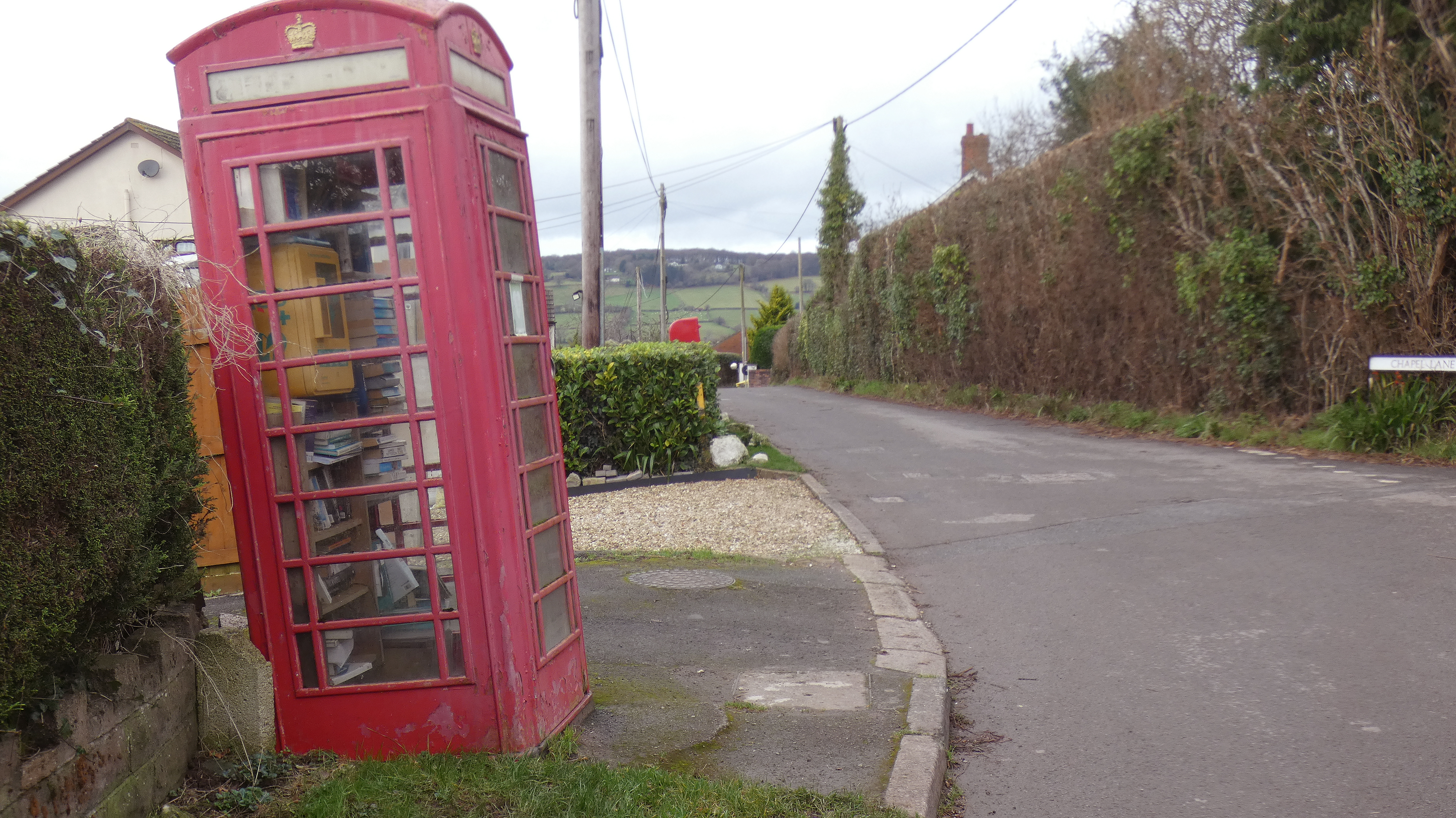
Old telephone box by start of Chapel Lane

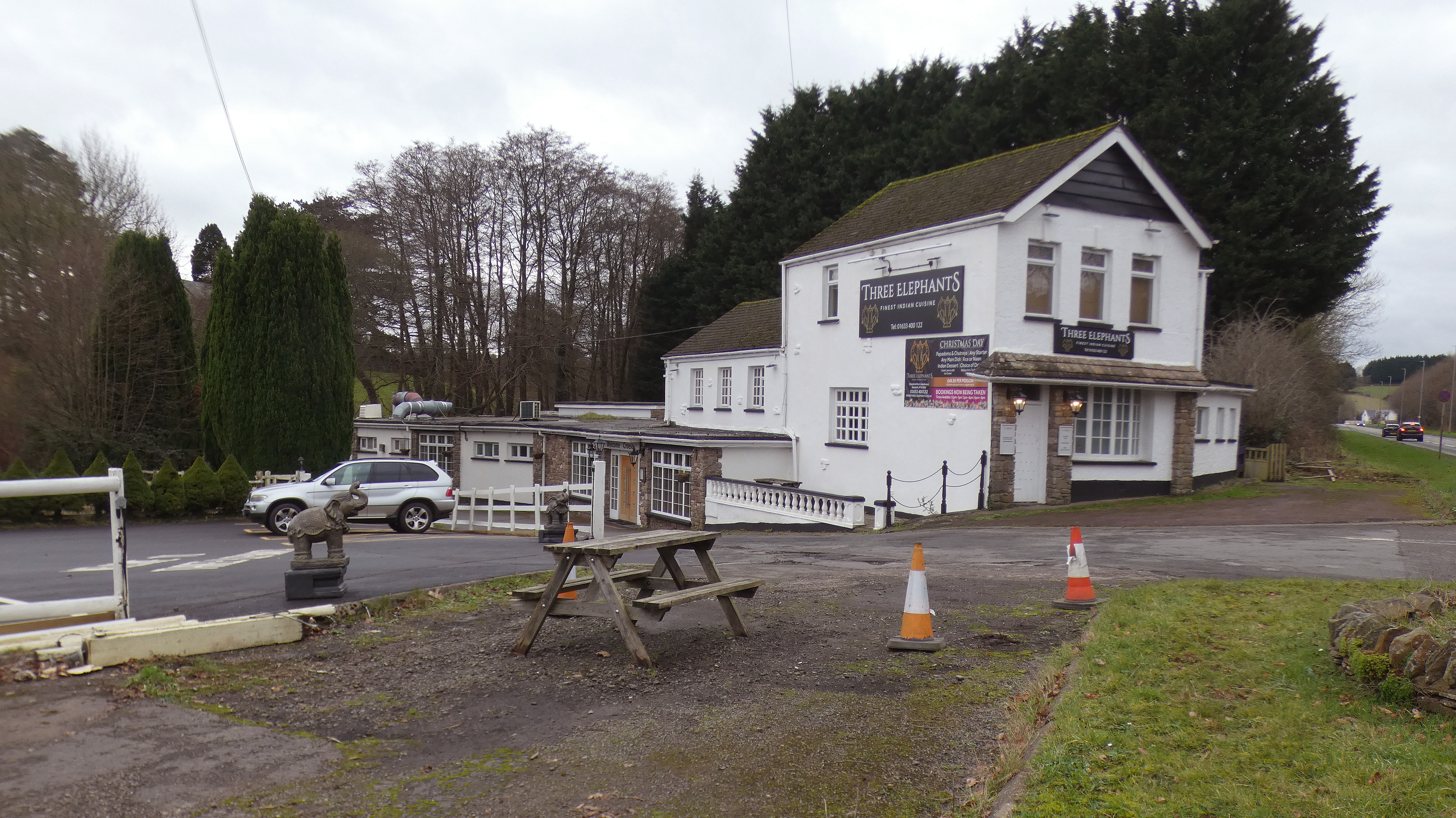
The Three Elephants Indian restaurant by the A48 Newport-Chepstow road, historically the Rising Sun Inn.

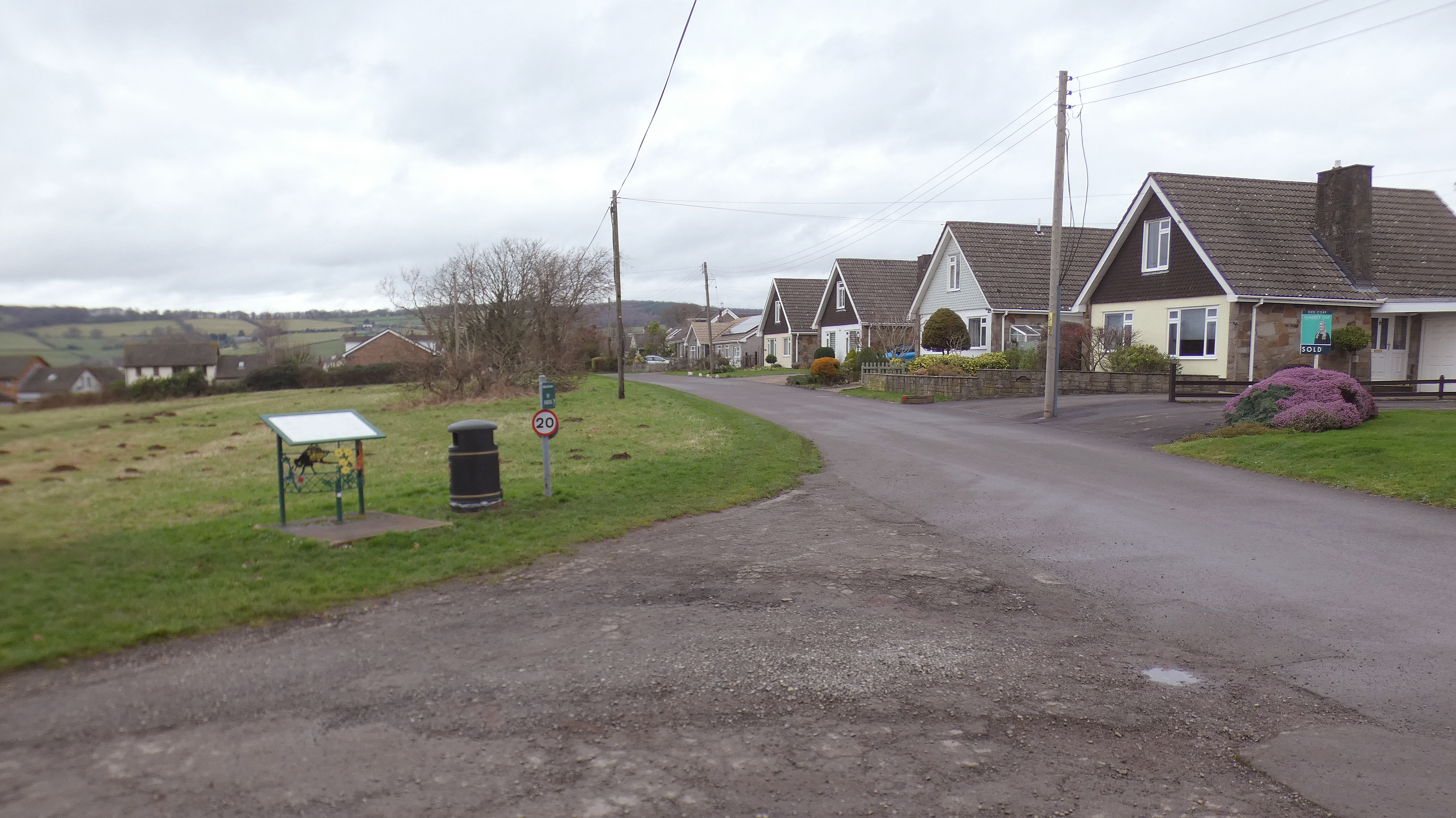
Llandevaud Common and Upper Road.

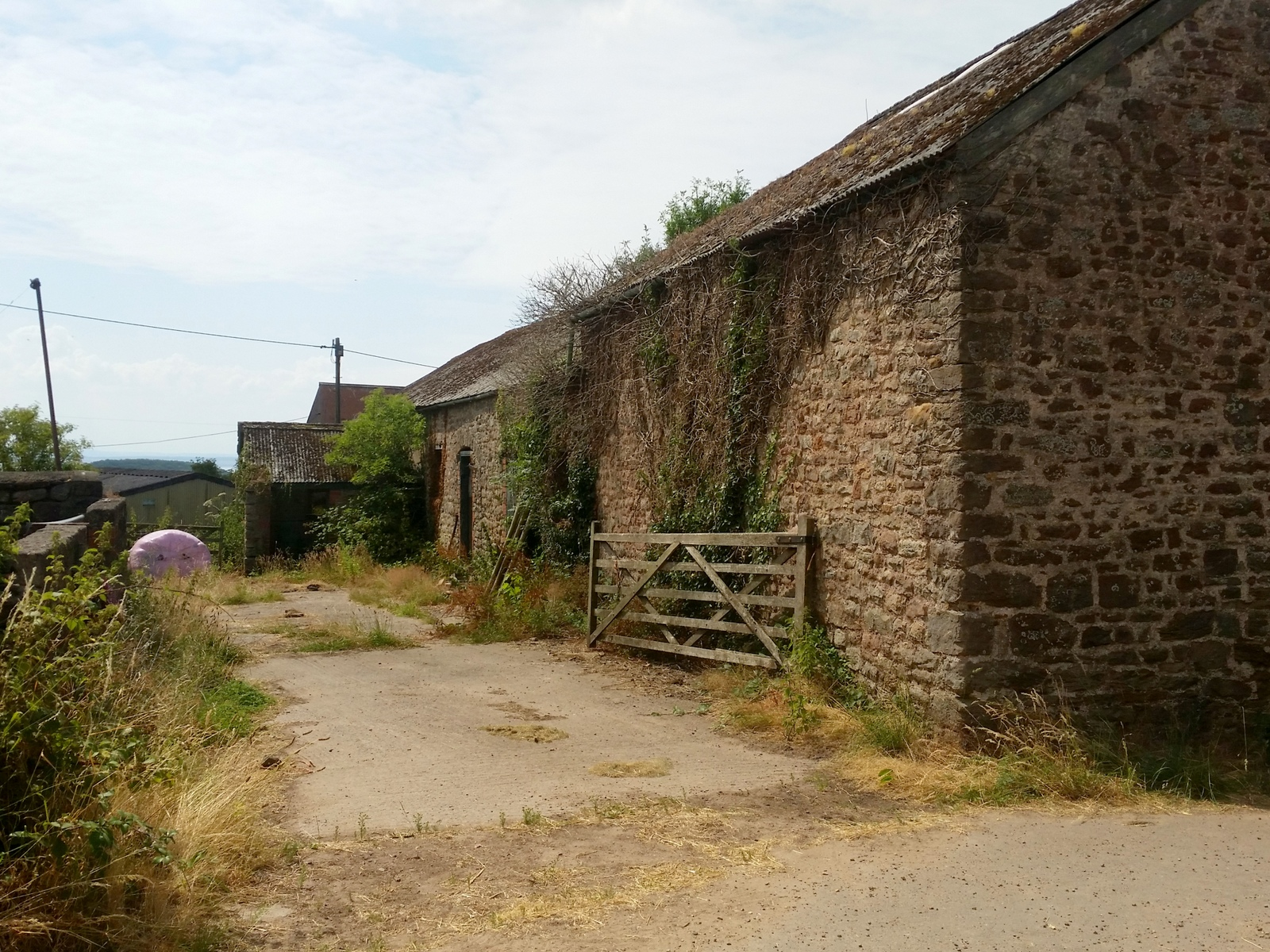
Old farm buildings at Chapel Farm, Llandevaud

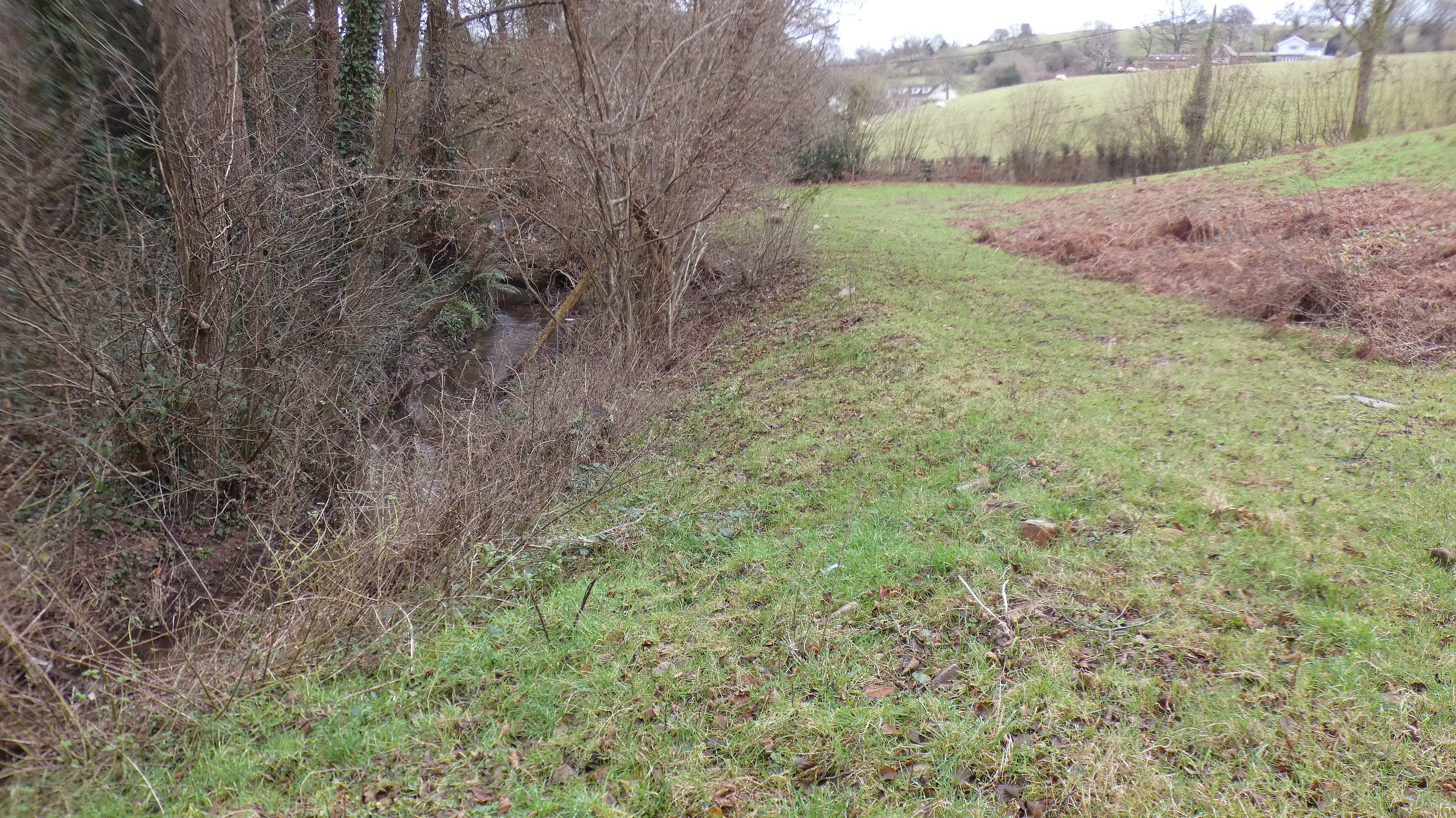
Stream (left) linked to the old Llandevaud Mill, looking towards houses along Pencoed Lane.
