= Caldicot Hundred =

Ancient hundred of Monmouthshire, Wales

Caldicot
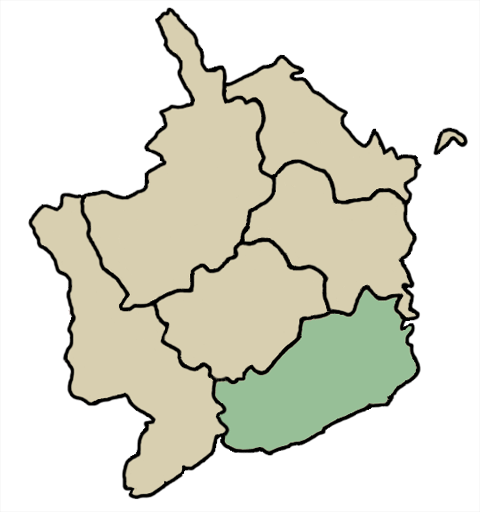
- Caldicot within Monmouthshire
- Area
  - 1831: 52,550 acres (212.7 km^{2})
- History
  - Created: 1542
- Status: hundred
- Subdivisions
  - Type: Divisions
  - Units: Higher and Lower

Caldicot was an ancient hundred of Monmouthshire, Wales.

It was situated in the south-eastern part of the county, bounded on the north by the hundreds of Usk and Raglan; on the east by Gloucestershire; on the south by the Bristol Channel, and on the west by the hundred of Wentloog.

It contained the following ancient parishes:

- Bishton
- Caerwent
- Caldicot
- Chepstow
- Christchurch
- Dinham
- Forest of Wentwood
- Goldcliff
- Howick
- Ifton
- Itton
- Langstone
- Llandevaud
- Llandevenny
- Llanmartin
- Llanvaches
- Llanvair Discoed
- Llanvihangel Roggiet
- Llanwern
- Magor
- Mathern
- Mounton
- Nash
- Newchurch
- Penhow
- Penterry
- Portskewett
- Redwick
- Rogiet
- Runston
- Shirenewton
- St. Arvans
- St. Brides Netherwent
- St. Pierre
- Sudbrook
- Undy
- Whitson
- Wilcrick

The area is now administered by the local authorities of Newport and Monmouthshire.
