= Wentloog Hundred =

Ancient hundred in Monmouthshire

Wentloog
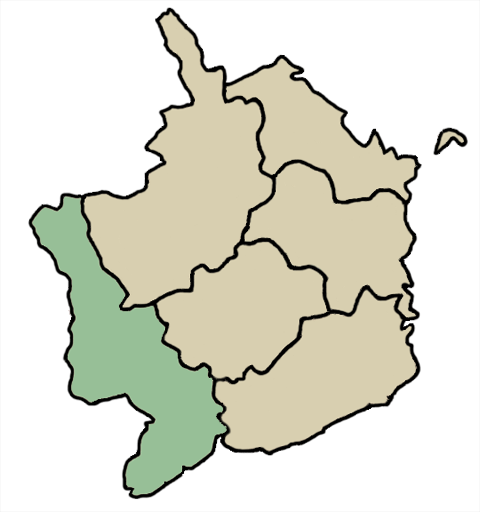
- Wentloog within Monmouthshire
- Area
  - 1831: 66,160 acres (267.7 km^{2})
- History
  - Origin: Gwynllŵg
  - Created: 1542
- Status: hundred

Wentloog (also known as Wentlloog and Wentllooge) was an ancient hundred of Monmouthshire. It was also known as Newport hundred.

It was situated in the western part of the county, bounded to the north by Brecknockshire; on the east by the hundreds of Abergavenny, Usk and Caldicot; on the south by the Bristol Channel, and on the west by Glamorganshire. Wentloog is an anglicisation of the Welsh Gwynllŵg, the name of the early kingdom and medieval cantref.

It contained the following ancient parishes:

- Aberystruth
- Bassaleg: consisting of Duffryn township, Graig hamlet and Rogerstone township
- Bedwas
- Bedwellty
- Bettws
- Coedkernew
- Henllys
- Llanfihangel Llantarnam
- Llanhilleth
- Machen
- Malpas
- Marshfield
- Michaelston y vedw
- Mynyddislwyn
- Newport
- Peterstone Wentlooge
- Risca
- Rumney
- St. Brides Wentlooge
- St. Mellons
- St. Woolos

The area is now administered by several local authorities, in particular Newport, Torfaen, Blaenau Gwent and Caerphilly.

== See also ==
- Wentlooge community (parish)
- Gwynllwg
