= Usk Hundred =

Usk
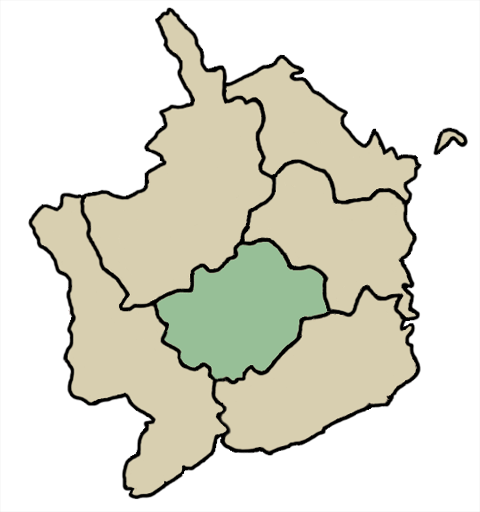
- Usk within Monmouthshire
- Area
  - 1831: 46,060 acres (186.4 km^{2})
- Population
  - 1861: 13,859
- History
  - Created: 1542
- Status: hundred
- Subdivisions
  - Type: Divisions
  - Units: Higher and Lower

Usk was an ancient hundred of Monmouthshire.

It was situated in the centre of the county, bounded to the north by the hundreds of Abergavenny and Raglan; to the east and south by the hundred of Caldicot; and to the west by the hundred of Wentloog.

It contains the following ancient parishes:

- Caerleon township
- Gwehelog Fawr
- Gwernesney
- Kemeys
- Kemeys Commander
- Little Mill
- Llanbadog
- Llandegveth
- Llangattock
- Llangeview
- Llangwm
- Llangybi Fawr
- Llanhennock
- Llanllywel
- Llanthewy Vach
- Llantrissant Fawr
- Llanvihangel Pont y Moile
- Llanfrechfa
- Panteg
- Tintern
- Tredunnock
- Trostre
- Usk

The administration of the area is now divided between the local authorities of Newport, Torfaen and Monmouthshire.
