= Kilgwrrwg =

Coordinates: 51.680278°N 2.768889°W

Welsh: Cilgwrrwg
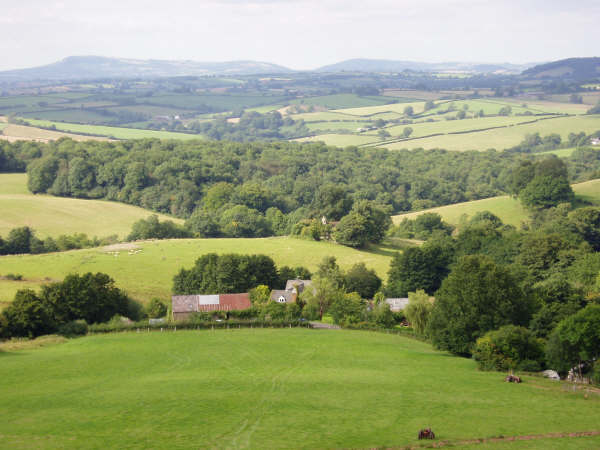
- View of rolling countryside at Kilgwrrwg, looking northwards

- Location within Monmouthshire
- OS grid reference: ST462985
- Principal area: Monmouthshire
- Preserved county: Gwent
- Country: Wales
- Sovereign state: United Kingdom
- Post town: CHEPSTOW
- Postcode district: NP16
- Dialling code: 01291
- Police: Gwent
- Fire: South Wales
- Ambulance: Welsh
- UK Parliament: Monmouth

Kilgwrrwg (Welsh: Cilgwrrwg) is a rural parish in Monmouthshire, south east Wales, United Kingdom. It is located 7 miles (11 km) north west of Chepstow and 7 miles (11 km) south east of Usk in a network of country lanes running through the rolling hills below the Trellech ridge.

== History ==
The Welsh placename element cil means a corner, or retreat, usually in a religious context, and the settlement name is suggestive of its Celtic Christian origins. In 1811 the parish had a population of 133, and in 1831 it had a population of 113 and 26 houses. Historically the parish was part of the Hundred of Raglan and was endowed by the Diocese of Llandaff.

In the 1980s and early 1990s, Kilgwrrwg was home to American war correspondent and novelist Martha Gellhorn, the widow of Ernest Hemingway.

== Church of the Holy Cross ==
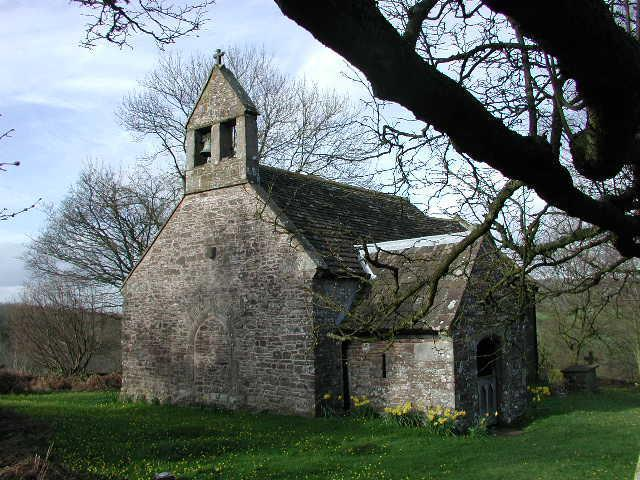
Church of the Holy Cross

The Church of the Holy Cross at Kilgwrrwg is one of the most remote parish churches in the UK still in regular use. It can only be reached by crossing two fields and a stream from the nearest house.

The church is surrounded by a partly curved churchyard, suggesting a Celtic foundation, and has been described as "the most perfect example of an early Christian site". It is thought to have been referred to indirectly in a charter of about 722, cited in the Book of Llandaff. According to local legend, the location of the church was determined when a pair of heifers, yoked together, were left to wander, and came to rest on a small mound, signifying that the place was divinely ordained for a church to be built there.

The churchyard contains a plain short-armed stone cross, impossible to date accurately but thought by some to be pre-Norman and described by others as mediaeval. There is also a stone carving of a head, again thought to be pre-Norman and sometimes described as a female fertility figure, placed in the wall. The church is built of Old Red Sandstone. It contains some Early English architectural features, including the walls and a window in the nave.

By the early nineteenth century, the building was partly ruined and used as a livestock shelter. According to the local schoolteacher and philanthropist James Davies of Devauden,

"...the little church was in decay; rain and snow penetrated through the roof into the body of the building, and a neighbouring farmer folded his sheep within the walls of God's house. On twelve Sundays in the year, and on those only, was public worship performed in that church; and on those occasions the accumulated filth of sheep and cattle was shovelled out the day before."

Davies encouraged the local residents to pay for the re-roofing of the church. It was further restored by John Prichard around 1871, and a porch, bellcote and windows were added at that time. Further restoration work was carried out in 1989/90. It is a Grade II* listed building.

== Other buildings ==
Kilgwrrwg House is a hall house of the early sixteenth century, with a massive chimney stack of later date. The house is of architectural and historical interest.

The small hamlet of Kilgwrrwg Common is located about one mile from the church. Great Kilgwrrwg Farm is also located in the vicinity.
