= Trelleck Grange =

Coordinates: 51.71082°N 2.73663°W

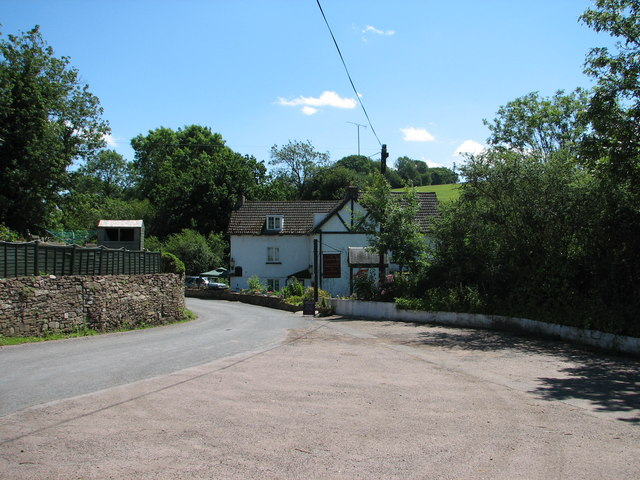
Trelleck Grange

Trelleck Grange (or Trellech Grange) is a small hamlet in a rural area of Monmouthshire, south east Wales, United Kingdom, about seven miles south of Monmouth.

== Location ==
Trelleck Grange is located about three miles south of Trellech, two miles west of Tintern, and seven miles south of Monmouth, the county town of Monmouthshire. It sits on high ground above the Wye Valley Area of Outstanding Natural Beauty and Tintern Abbey, between two tributaries of the Angiddy Brook.

== Etymology ==
The name "Trelleck" derives from the Welsh "llech" meaning a conspicuous stone. It may have referred to a large stone which rested on a mound near the village, perhaps near "Rock Cottage". However the most conspicuous feature in the locality is a line of three standing stones known as Harold's stones, apparently a seventeenth century name. They may also account for the "tri" (meaning three) part of the name, although one would expect the feminine form "tair" to be used as "llech" is feminine (unless it has changed its gender).

== History and amenities ==
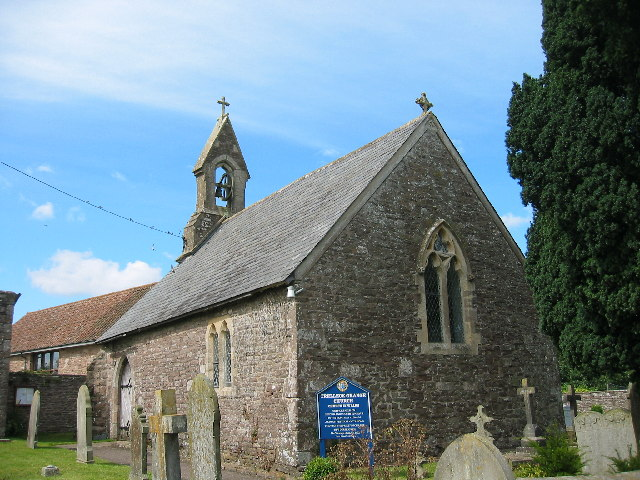
Trelleck Grange Church

The area was once part of the manor of Trellech, with a church known as Ecclesia Mainuon, but in 1138 it was granted to the monks of the then newly established Tintern Abbey by Gilbert de Clare, the Marcher lord of Striguil or Chepstow. The monks then cultivated it as a grange, making it the principal farm for food production for the Abbey.

A small parish church, with no known dedication, still exists, surrounded by farm buildings. It was largely rebuilt on the original foundations in 1861. The village sits above the Angiddy valley and provided homes and accommodation for the 'Iron workers' who worked in the many iron works in the area, including Pontysaison between 1600 and 1870. There are 2 known 'Squatters' houses in Trellech Grange which eventually became proper houses; the Duke of Beaufort allowed squatters as long as they paid a rent.
