= Wentlooge =

- Location within Newport
- Population: 720 (2001 census)
- OS grid reference: ST289822
- Principal area: Newport
- Country: Wales
- Sovereign state: United Kingdom
- Post town: CARDIFF
- Postcode district: CF3
- Post town: NEWPORT
- Postcode district: NP10
- Dialling code: 01633; Maesglas and Castleton exchanges
- Police: Gwent
- Fire: South Wales
- Ambulance: Welsh
- UK Parliament: Newport West
- List of places UK Wales Newport 51.53421°N 3.02645°W Map of the community

Wentlooge (Welsh: Gwynllŵg), sometimes known as Wentloog, is a community in the southwest of the city of Newport, South Wales, in the Marshfield ward. The community includes Peterstone Wentlooge and St. Brides Wentlooge and in 2011 had a population of 737.

== Description ==
The name Wentlooge is a corruption of the earlier name Gwynllŵg, said to have been named after Gwynllyw, its 5th - 6th century ruler.

The community is bounded by Percoed reen to the northwest, the Ebbw River to the northeast, the Bristol Channel to the southeast and the South Wales Main Line to the southwest. It contains the hamlets of St Brides Wentloog and Peterstone Wentloog.

The West Usk Lighthouse is built on the shore of the Bristol Channel in the far east of the community.

== Government ==
The area is governed by the Newport City Council and the Wentlooge community council.

== Commercial development ==
Located between Cardiff and Newport, and in a non-protected but designated green belt to allow for definition between the two cities, the area has been subjected to a series of planned light industrial developments. These include warehouses and other facilities, including a rail freight container terminal operated by Freightliner Group.

== See also ==
- Wentloog hundred
