= Llanfihangel Tor-y-Mynydd =

Coordinates: 51.7162°N 2.7825°W

- Location within Monmouthshire
- OS grid reference: SO 463 018
- Principal area: Monmouthshire
- Preserved county: Gwent
- Country: Wales
- Sovereign state: United Kingdom
- Post town: USK
- Postcode district: NP15
- Dialling code: 01291
- Police: Gwent
- Fire: South Wales
- Ambulance: Welsh
- UK Parliament: Monmouth

Llanfihangel Tor-y-Mynydd (or more correctly Llanfihangel-tor-y-mynydd, meaning, in Welsh, "the church of St. Michael on the breast of the mountain") is a small rural village in the community of Devauden, Monmouthshire, Wales. It is located within the Vale of Usk, about 9 miles south west of Monmouth and 6 miles east of the town of Usk, between the villages of Devauden and Llansoy.

== History ==
The parish was reputedly settled by descendants of St. Brychan Brycheiniog, in particular Cynog, who gave his name to the area and former church at Llangunnock, immediately south of Llanfihangel Tor-y-Mynydd.

== Church of St. Michael ==
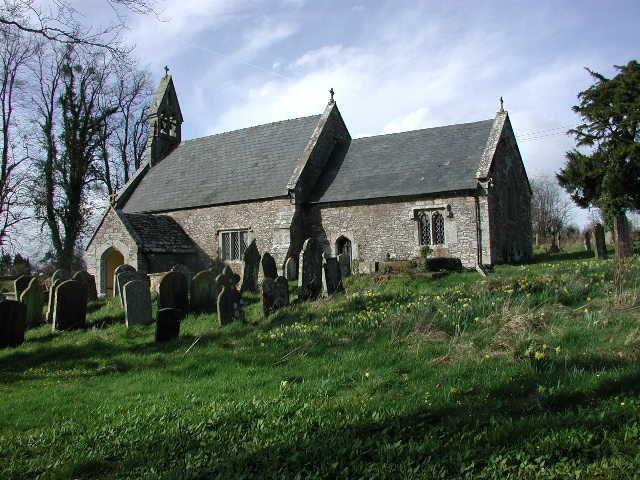
Church of St Michael

The parish church of St Michael has a mediaeval nave and chancel, but was substantially restored in 1853/54. It is a Grade II* listed building.

== Star Inn ==
The Star Inn has been in existence since at least the 15th century, and was an important staging post on the road leading from Chepstow towards Usk and Raglan. It was visited in 1748 by the preacher John Wesley, who described it as "a good though small inn". It remains a popular inn and restaurant. The long hill between Llansoy and Devauden is known as Star Hill.
