= Oldcastle, Monmouthshire =

Village in Monmouthshire, Wales

Coordinates: 51.91491°N 2.98422°W

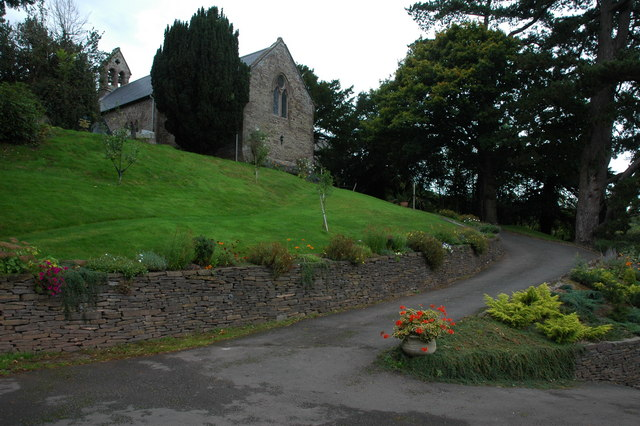
Oldcastle church

Oldcastle (Welsh: Yr Hencastell) is a small village in Monmouthshire, South East Wales. It is six miles north of Abergavenny just off the unclassified Longtown Road from Pandy to Longtown, Herefordshire, alongside which the River Monnow runs. The village lies between the conrasting topographies of the Black Mountains (811 metres at their highest) and south-western Herefordshire (less than 159 metres high) on the other side of the Wales-England border. Its height is 170 metres. The village has a well-documented history which dates from the 19th century.

== Administration ==
The postal address of Oldcastle is the village of Pandy, which is on the A465 road between Abergavenny and Hereford. It is part of the Community council administrative ward of Crucorney which in turn is the electoral ward for Monmouthshire County Council (formerly Gwent), and elects one county concillor. The parish was formerly part of the deaconry of Brecon. However, it is currently part of the unitary area of Monmouthshire, the village falls under the Diocese of Monmouth.

== History ==
=== The 19th Century ===
English historian and priest William Coxe reached Oldcastle as part of his famous tour of Monmouthshire which he documented in his two-volume An historical tour of Monmouthshire (1801). He commented:

'This little village has been magnified into a Roman Ration, and erroneoufiy fuppofed by Gale and Stukeley to be the fite of the ancient Bleftium, although neither its pofition or appearance in the fmalleft degree juftify the conjecture. This opinion was founded merely on the difcovery of a few Roman coins, and on the vefliges of ancient encampments in the vicinity. There are indeed the remains of many encampments, and the Roman road from Gobannium or Abergavenny, to Magna or Kenchefter, ran in the direction of the prefent high road from Lanvihangel to Longtown. It is therefore probable, that the Romans had fmall camps for the protection of this road, of which the fuppofed Ration of OldcaRle may have been one. Slight traces of circular entrenchments are vifible near the church, but not fufficient to indicate either the sera or purpofe of their conftruction.'

Coxe later claimed that Oldcastle 'was remarkable as the refidence of the celebrated reformer fir John Oldcaftle lord Cobham, who is called by Horace Walpole, “the firft author, as well as the firft martyr among our nobility"', who he discussed in some detail. He concluded:

'The old caftle, called the court houfe, fuppofed to be the refidence of this celebrated perfonage, was taken down about thirty years ago, and a new farm houfe conftrufted from the materials. Although nothing remains to fatisfy the antiquary or hiftorian, yet the traveller will be pleafed with the fingular and pidlurefque fituation of the church and village, on the fides of a bleak and hoary mountain, the fummit of which overhangs the fequeftered vale of Ewias, and commands an extenfive view of the fertile diftrifts of Herefordfliire and Monmouthfliire. The contraft between the bleak fummit of the mountain and the rich meadows beneath, which are watered by the winding Monnow, is extremely ftriking.'

Local historian John White (1845) documented: 'Old Castle is about four miles from Llanvihangel, and is situated on the slope of the Black Mountains. This castle is well worthy of the traveller's attention upon more than one account — it has been supposed, by some writers, that a fortress was erected on this spot prior to the Norman invasion, by a British chieftain, about the ninth century, and was co-existent with Castel Gw}n (White Castle).' (Italics in the original) White further observed: 'The old castle, the residence of this celebrated man, was taken down some years ago, and a farmhouse constructed of the materials. Slight vestiges of circular entrenchments may still be observed near the church, but though there may be little la giatify the antiquary, the traveller will find the pictftoisqueness of the situation, and the fine scenery it commands, ample reward for the time he may spend in reaching it.'

=== The 20th century ===
English historian Joseph Bradney observed in his A history of Monmouthshire from the coming of the Normans into Wales down to the present time (1906) that Oldcastle is called in Welsh Hen-gasgtell, and that it 'takes its name from the ancient earthwork on which the Court and Church stand.' He continued: 'This work doubtless marks a Roman station, being on the road from Gobannium (Abergavenny) to Magna (Kenchester).' Bradney claimed that the parish contains 934 acres of land. The table below reproduces his documentation of its steady decline in population from 1801 to 1901.

Year	1801	1811	1821	1831	1841	1851	1861	1871	1881	1901
No. of Inhab.	83	65	67	62	58	60	59	50	57	35

The estate of Oldcastle including the church was part of the property of Llanthony Priory which, following the Dissolution, was granted to Sir Nicholas Arnold. By 1799 the estate had come into the possession of the Earl of Oxford, who had many estates in Monmouthshire which amounted to 4,285 acres of land. His trustees put up his estates for sale, which was held at The Angel Inn (now The Angel Hotel) in Abergavenny. Then, as Bradley expressed it, 'At or immediaely after the sale Oldcastle was purchased by Mr. William Higginson, who left it to his great-nephew Edmund Barneby, with the proviso of taking the name of Higginson.' Consequently, Edmund Barneby became Edmund Barneby Higginson, who in 1828 was the High Sheriff of Herefordshire. Higginson left the estate to his nephew, William Barneby, after which his second son, Philip Bartholomew Barneby (of Wilcroft, Hereford) who, as Bradley described him 'now has the manor, with the whole of the land in the parish.'

Without mentioning or alluding to Coxe, Bradney disputed the claim that Oldcastle was the birthplace and residence of Sir John Oldcastle stating that 'it has been conclusively proved that he had nothing to do with this Oldcastle.'

== Archive ==
- Bartholomew Barneby, Philip. "Parts of the Trewyn and Old Castle Estates in the parishes of Walterstone, Bwlch Trwyn & Llanfihangel Crucorney in the counties of Herefordshire and Monmouthshire" (15 Apr 1930). Portions of the Trewyn and Old Castle Estates (450a.), 15 lots. 1 loose plan (coloured). With details of purchasers and/or prices added in pencil., Box: 1 booklet and 1 paper, File: Item, ID: DSA/6/863. Cardiff: Glamorgan Archives.
