= Skenfrith Hundred =

Skenfrith
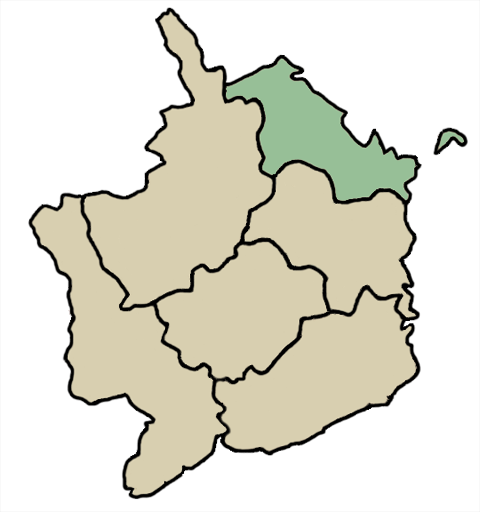
- Skenfrith within Monmouthshire
- Area
  - 1831: 33,610
- History
  - Created: 1542
- Status: hundred

Skenfrith was an ancient hundred of Monmouthshire.

It contained the following ancient parishes:

- Grosmont
- Llantilio Crossenny
- Llangattock-Vibon-Avel
- Monmouth
- Rockfield
- Skenfrith
- St. Maughans
- Wonastow

The exclave of Welsh Bicknor was transferred to Herefordshire in 1844. Other parts of the hundred are now administered by the local authority of Monmouthshire.
