= Raglan Hundred =

Historical division of Monmouthshire, Wales

Raglan
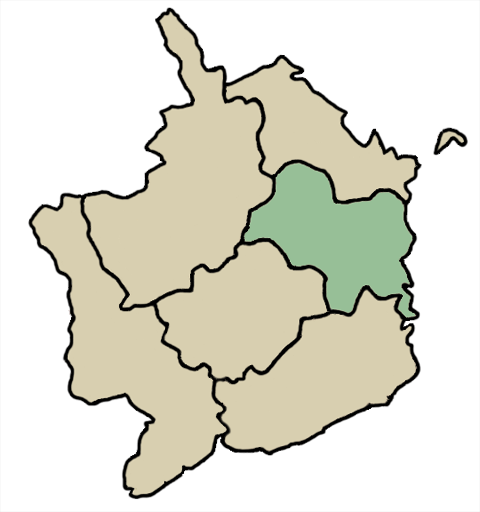
- Raglan within Monmouthshire
- Area
  - 1831: 324,310 acres (1,312.4 km^{2})
- Population
  - 1851: 5,032
  - 1861: 2,751
- History
  - Created: 1542
- Status: hundred
- Subdivisions
  - Type: Divisions
  - Units: Higher and Lower

Raglan (also known as Ragland and Rhaglan) was an ancient hundred of Monmouthshire.

It contained the following ancient parishes:

- Betws Newydd
- Bryngwn
- Chapel Hill
- Cilgwrwg
- Cwmcarfan
- Devauden
- Llandenny
- Llandevenny hamlet
- Llandogo
- Llangoven
- Llanishen
- Llanvihangel Tor y Mynydd
- Llansoe
- Llanvihangel-Ystern-Llewern
- Mitchell Troy
- Pen Rhos township
- Pen y Clawdd
- Penalt
- Raglan
- Tregare
- Trelleck Grange
- Tryleg
- Wolvesnewton

It is now administered by the local authority of Monmouthshire.
