= St Brides Wentloog =

Hamlet in Newport, Wales

Coordinates: 51.5343°N 3.0207°W

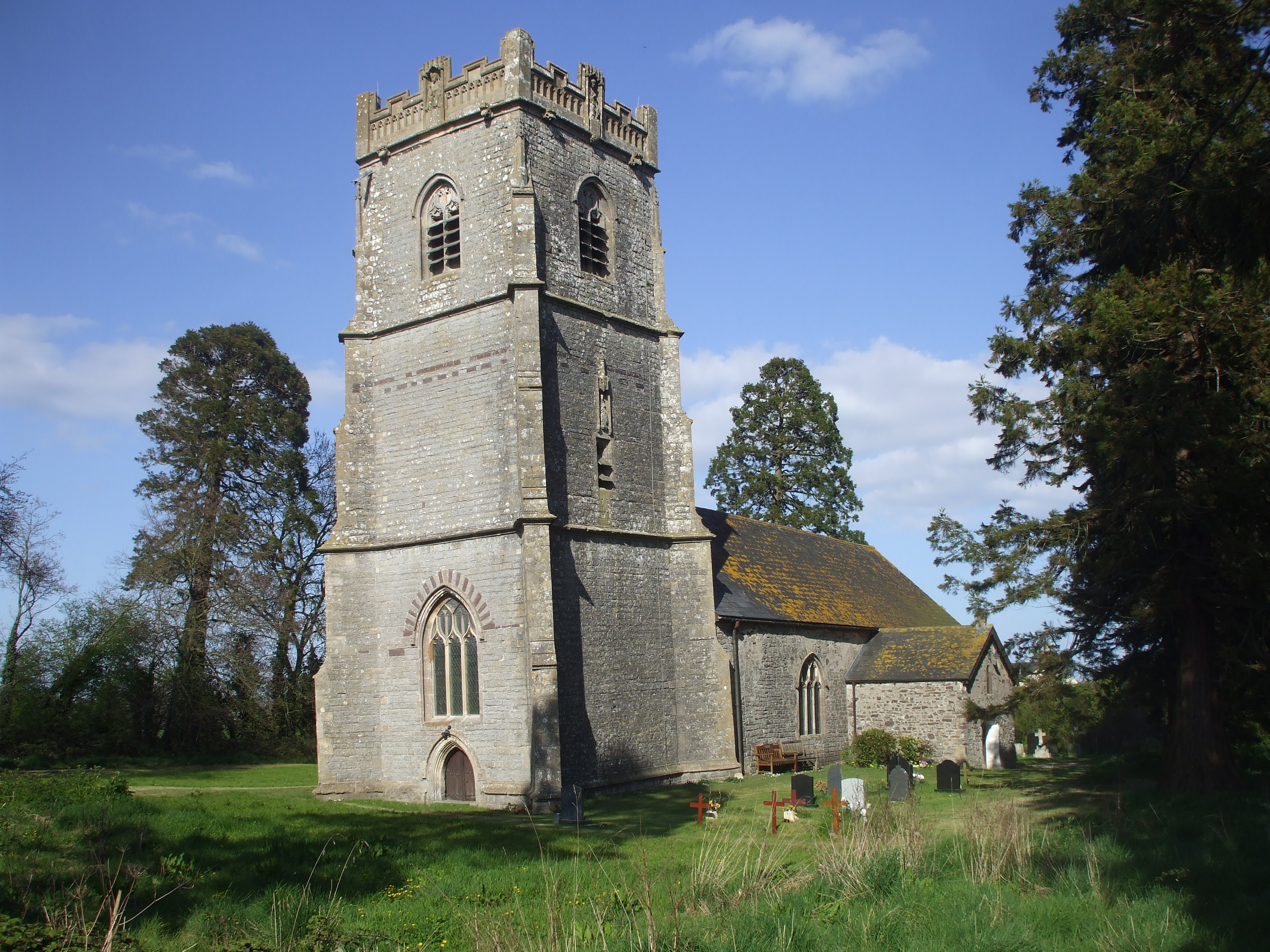
St Bridget's Church

St Brides Wentloog (also spelled St Bride's Wentloog or St Brides Wentlooge or simply St Bride's; Welsh: Llansanffraid Gwynllŵg) is a hamlet to the south west of the city of Newport in South Wales.

== Location ==
The hamlet lies in the parish of Wentlooge and electoral district (ward) of Marshfield. Like most of the settlements on the Wentloog Level it lies on land behind the sea wall, reclaimed from the Bristol Channel, and criss-crossed by large and small drainage ditches, known locally as reens.

== History ==
The church of St Bride is dedicated to Saint Bridget. It is an ancient building, largely rebuilt in the 15th century, of stone in the Decorated and Perpendicular styles. It consists of chancel, nave, south porch and an unusually fine perpendicular embattled western tower housing six bells, four of which are dated 1734 and bear inscriptions. A plaque inside the porch marks the high-tide level of the Bristol Channel floods of 1607.

The village was the birthplace of Lyn Harding (1867–1952), actor of stage, silent and talkie films, and radio.
