= List of scheduled monuments in Newport =

Newport unitary authority area, in Wales, has 71 scheduled monuments. With a Neolithic chambered tomb, three Bronze Age sites and seven Iron Age hillforts, it demonstrates a range of prehistoric occupation. However, with an entire Roman town at Caerleon, and Roman villas and forts, it is an important area for Welsh Roman archaeology. It is unlike much of South Wales in having far more medieval sites (28) than modern ones (4), with hardly any industrial monuments. All of the sites on this list (and the whole of Newport) are within the historic county of Monmouthshire. One site lies on the border into a neighbouring county, and is included on both lists.

Scheduled monuments have statutory protection. The compilation of the list is undertaken by Cadw Welsh Historic Monuments, which is an executive agency of the National Assembly of Wales. The list of scheduled monuments below is supplied by Cadw with additional material from RCAHMW and Glamorgan-Gwent Archaeological Trust.

== Scheduled monuments in Newport ==
Image	Name	Site type	Community	Location	Details	Period	SAM No & Refs
Gwern y Cleppa	Gwern y Cleppa Burial Chamber	Chambered long barrow	Coedkernew	51.5597°N 3.0452°W, ST276850	Seven tumbled stones, thought to be the sides and capstone of a neolithic long barrow with commanding views over the Severn Estuary	Prehistoric (neolithic)	MM022
	Twyn Pant-Teg Round Barrow	Round barrow	Graig	51.5934°N 3.0987°W, ST239888		Prehistoric	MM065
	Round Barrow 57m South of Stock Wood	Round barrow	Langstone	51.5979°N 2.8937°W, ST381891		Prehistoric	MM170
	Druidstone Standing Stone	Standing stone	Michaelstone-y-Fedw	51.5445°N 3.0953°W, ST241834		Prehistoric (Bronze Age)	MM032
	Wilcrick Hill Camp	Hillfort	Bishton, (also Magor with Undy), (see also Monmouthshire)	51.5859°N 2.8512°W, ST411877		Prehistoric	MM127
	Lodge Wood Camp	Hillfort	Caerleon	51.617°N 2.9788°W, ST323913		Prehistoric	MM023
	Priory Wood Camp	Enclosure	Caerleon	51.6091°N 2.9244°W, ST360904		Prehistoric	MM049
	St Julian's Wood Camp	Hillfort	Caerleon	51.5969°N 2.9541°W, ST340891		Prehistoric	MM021
	Coed y Defaid Camp	Hillfort	Coedkernew	51.5701°N 3.0499°W, ST273862		Prehistoric	MM134
	Tredegar Fort	Hillfort	Gaer	51.5756°N 3.0274°W, ST289868		Prehistoric	MM084
	Pen-y-Lan Camp	Enclosure	Michaelstone-y-Fedw	51.5579°N 3.071°W, ST258848	Oval enclosure on a low hilltop site near the small settlement of Pen-y-lan	Prehistoric (Iron Age)	MM133
	Castell Prin	Hillfort	Penhow	51.6272°N 2.8539°W, ST409923	Banked enclosure on a wooded hilltop north of the village of Parc Seymour	Prehistoric (Iron Age)	MM130
	Abernant Roman Kiln	Kiln	Caerleon	51.6178°N 2.9142°W, ST368913		Roman	MM257
Caerleon Roman Amphitheatre	Caerleon Amphitheatre	Amphitheatre	Caerleon	51.6081°N 2.9569°W, ST338903		Roman	MM232
	Caerleon Civil Settlement	Civil settlement	Caerleon	51.6118°N 2.9626°W, ST334907		Roman	MM231
	Caerleon Civil Settlement: Area under Broadway Playing Fields	Civil settlement	Caerleon	51.6088°N 2.96°W, ST336904		Roman	MM254
	Caerleon Civil Settlement: Site of Roman Building SE of Castle Street	Civil settlement	Caerleon	51.609°N 2.9488°W, ST344904		Roman	MM244
Caerleon Roman Baths	Caerleon Roman Fortress and Baths	Legionary fortress	Caerleon	51.6103°N 2.9588°W, ST337906		Roman	MM230
	Caerleon Legionary Fortress: Area behind Caerleon House	Legionary fortress	Caerleon	51.609°N 2.9531°W, ST340904		Roman	MM240
	Caerleon Legionary Fortress: Area between Priory Hotel and Priory Lodge	Legionary fortress	Caerleon	51.6095°N 2.955°W, ST339905		Roman	MM236
	Caerleon Legionary Fortress: Area of Myrtle Cottage Barracks	Legionary fortress	Caerleon	51.6104°N 2.9525°W, ST341906		Roman	MM242
	Caerleon Legionary Fortress: Area off White Hart Lane	Legionary fortress	Caerleon	51.609°N 2.9536°W, ST340904		Roman	MM243
	Caerleon Legionary Fortress: Back Garden of No 4 Museum Street	Legionary fortress	Caerleon	51.6104°N 2.9545°W, ST339906		Roman	MM239
	Caerleon Legionary Fortress: Car Park and Garden of Endowed School, North of Broadway	Fort	Caerleon	51.6099°N 2.9565°W, ST338906		Roman	MM252
Caerleon - Roman Prysg Field Barracks	Caerleon Legionary Fortress: Field SE of Broadway	Legionary fortress	Caerleon	51.6092°N 2.9566°W, ST338904		Roman	MM237
	Caerleon Legionary Fortress: Former Ambulance Station Field	Legionary fortress	Caerleon	51.6128°N 2.9523°W, ST341908		Roman	MM262
	Caerleon Legionary Fortress: Former Garden of The Firs	Legionary fortress	Caerleon	51.6097°N 2.9532°W, ST340905		Roman	MM248
Northern end of Goldcroft Common, Caerleon	Caerleon Legionary Fortress: Goldcroft Common	Legionary fortress	Caerleon	51.6121°N 2.9574°W, ST338908		Roman	MM233
	Caerleon Legionary Fortress: Grounds of Health Clinic	Legionary fortress	Caerleon	51.6119°N 2.9569°W, ST338907		Roman	MM245
Portico to the Roman Legionary Museum Caerleon	Caerleon Legionary Fortress: Grounds of Museum	Legionary fortress	Caerleon	51.6103°N 2.955°W, ST339905		Roman	MM238
	Caerleon Legionary Fortress: Grounds of St Cadoc's Home	Legionary fortress	Caerleon	51.6123°N 2.9553°W, ST339908		Roman	MM235
	Caerleon Legionary Fortress: Grounds of the Croft Nursing Home	Legionary fortress	Caerleon	51.6123°N 2.9565°W, ST338908		Roman	MM246
	Caerleon Legionary Fortress: Old Vicarage Garden	Legionary fortress	Caerleon	51.6108°N 2.9562°W, ST338906		Roman	MM247
	Caerleon Legionary Fortress: School Fields	Legionary fortress	Caerleon	51.6101°N 2.9581°W, ST338905		Roman	MM234
	Caerleon Legionary Fortress: Town Hall Park, High Street	Legionary fortress	Caerleon	51.6112°N 2.9571°W, ST338906		Roman	MM241
	Great Bulmore Roman Settlement	Civil settlement	Caerleon	51.6185°N 2.9285°W, ST358914		Roman	MM176
	Croes Carn Einion Roman Site	Villa	Graig	51.5709°N 3.073°W, ST257863		Roman	MM349
	Ford Farm Roman Villa	Villa	Langstone	51.6016°N 2.8901°W, ST384895		Roman	MM298
	Pen-toppen-ash Camp	Fort	Langstone	51.6192°N 2.8987°W, ST378915		Roman	MM042
	Bishton Castle	Motte	Bishton	51.5881°N 2.8784°W, ST392880		Medieval	MM128
	Deserted Medieval Village W of St Mary's Church	Deserted Medieval Village	Bishton	51.5875°N 2.8541°W, ST409879		Medieval	MM202
Castle Motte, Caerleon	Caerleon Castle Mound	Motte	Caerleon	51.6098°N 2.9508°W, ST342905		Medieval	MM014
	Castle Mound E of Graig Wood	Motte	Caerleon	51.6271°N 2.9853°W, ST318924		Medieval	MM087
	Medieval Tower at Hanbury Arms	Tower	Caerleon	51.6083°N 2.9521°W, ST341903		Medieval	MM037
	Moated Site in Coldra Wood	Moated Site	Caerleon	51.6039°N 2.9264°W, ST359898		Medieval	MM253
	Castell Glas Castle Mound	Motte	Gaer	51.5665°N 3.0087°W, ST301857		Medieval	MM190
	Goldcliff Moated House Site	Moated Site	Goldcliff	51.5475°N 2.9219°W, ST361835		Medieval	MM092
	St. Mary Magdalene's Churchyard Cross, Goldcliff	Cross	Goldcliff	51.5437°N 2.9167°W, ST365831		Medieval	MM313
	Castell Meredydd	Castle	Graig	51.5921°N 3.1195°W, ST225887		Medieval	MM186
	Ringwork 225m North East of Rhiwderyn	Ringwork	Graig	51.5837°N 3.0635°W, ST264877		Medieval	MM066
	St. Michael's Churchyard Cross, Machen	Cross	Graig	51.5861°N 3.1158°W, ST227880		Medieval	MM305
	All Saints' Church, Kemeys Inferior	Church	Langstone	51.6299°N 2.8958°W, ST380927		Medieval	MM174
	Caer Licyn	Motte	Langstone	51.6309°N 2.8829°W, ST389928		Medieval	MM043
	Kemeys Inferior Mound & Bailey Castle	Motte	Langstone	51.6406°N 2.8839°W, ST389939		Medieval	MM039
	Langstone Fish Pond	Fishpond	Langstone	51.6033°N 2.9047°W, ST374897		Medieval	MM058
	Langstone motte and enclosure	Motte & Bailey	Langstone	51.6013°N 2.9079°W, ST372895		Medieval	MM059
	Moated Site 200m South West of Court Farm	Moated Site	Langstone	51.6005°N 2.8818°W, ST390894		Medieval	MM188
	Moated Site 250m SW of Pencoed Castle	Moated Site	Langstone	51.5986°N 2.8612°W, ST404892		Medieval	MM201
Pencoed Castle	Pencoed Castle	Castle	Langstone	51.6003°N 2.859°W, ST406894		Medieval	MM274
	St Curig's Chapel (Remains of), Cats Ash	Chapel	Langstone	51.6122°N 2.9094°W, ST371907		Medieval	MM175
	Llanvaches Castle	Castle	Llanvaches	51.6244°N 2.8195°W, ST433920		Medieval	MM129
	Talgarth Settlement Earthworks	Deserted Medieval Village	Llanvaches	51.6235°N 2.8334°W, ST423919		Medieval	MM211
	St. Mary's Churchyard Cross, Llanwern	Cross base	Llanwern	51.586°N 2.9099°W, ST370878		Medieval	MM324
	St. Mary's Churchyard Cross, Marshfield	Cross base	Marshfield	51.5371°N 3.0661°W, ST261825		Medieval	MM311
	Wentloog Castle	Motte	Marshfield	51.5451°N 3.081°W, ST251834		Medieval	MM131
	Moated Site E of Grangefield Farm	Moated Site	Redwick	51.5601°N 2.8815°W, ST389849		Medieval	MM205
Remains of Newport Castle, South Wales	Newport Castle	Castle	Stow Hill	51.5908°N 2.9951°W, ST311884		Medieval	MM009
	Penrhos Camp (civil war earthworks)	Fort	Caerleon	51.6209°N 2.9514°W, ST342917	Earthwork bastions of a civil war fort, although Roman finds have also been reported.	Post-Medieval/Modern (17th century)	MM011
Top-most of the Fourteen Locks	Fourteen Locks, Monmouthshire Canal	Lock	Rogerstone	51.5913°N 3.0366°W, ST282885		Post-Medieval/Modern (1790s)	MM184
	Goldcliff Pill Anti-invasion Defences	Anti-tank obstacle	Goldcliff	51.539°N 2.919°W, ST363826		Post-Medieval/Modern (20th century)	MM353
	Coed y Caerau Auxiliary Unit Operational Base	Auxiliary Unit Site	Langstone	51.6212°N 2.897°W, ST377917	Well concealed WWII concrete bunkers. There are three buildings: and operational base, and ammunition store and a Special Duties Station.	Post-Medieval/Modern (20th century)	MM346

Scheduled Monuments in Newport, Wales.
=Prehistoric =Roman =Early Medieval
=Medieval =Post-Medieval/Modern

== See also ==
- List of Cadw properties
- List of castles in Wales
- List of hill forts in Wales
- Historic houses in Wales
- List of monastic houses in Wales
- List of museums in Wales
- List of Roman villas in Wales
- Grade I listed buildings in Newport
- Grade II* listed buildings in Newport
