= Llanbedr, Newport =

Hamlet in Newport, Wales

Coordinates: 51.612°N 2.889°W

Llanbedr: Llanbeder
- Hamlet
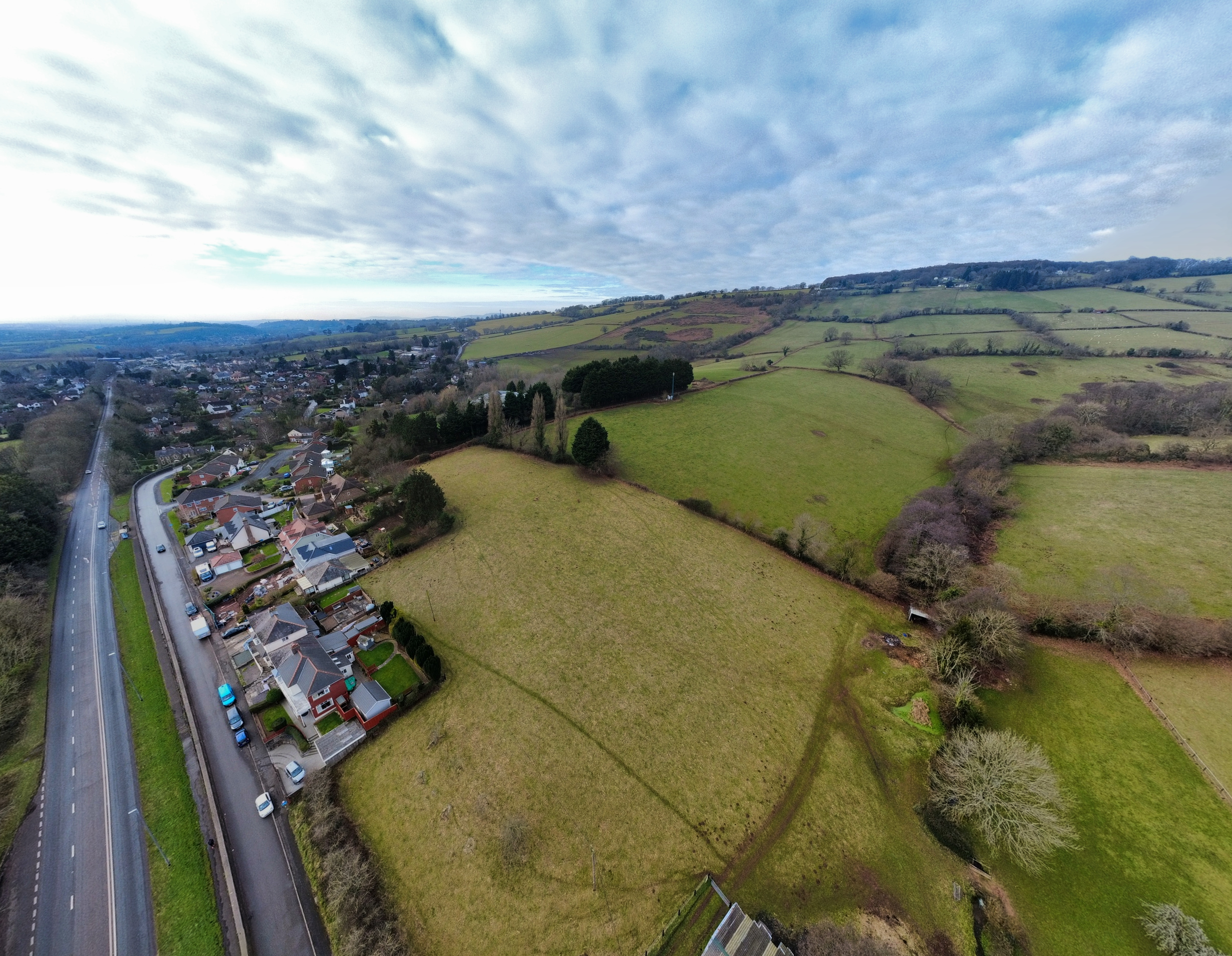
- Llanbedr, with dwellings by Tregarn Road and the fields of the old tithe area up to Coed-y-Caerau Lane.

- Location within Newport
- Community: Langstone
- Principal area: Newport
- Country: Wales
- Sovereign state: United Kingdom
- Police: Gwent
- Fire: South Wales
- Ambulance: Welsh
- UK Parliament: Newport East

Llanbedr, also spelled Llanbeder, is a hamlet in Newport, Wales. Located in the eastern part of Langstone, it forms part of the community and the historical parish of Langstone.

== Geography ==
The northern part of the old tithe area of Llanbedr is made up of coarse, buff sandstone (the elevated land of Kemys Graig which dominates the landscape is sandstone of the Brownstone formation) and the southern part, where most dwellings are, is soft and brown sandstone. There is a small raised area of river-deposited gravel on the alluvium at the very south of the hamlet area, within Llanbedr Farm, just south of the A48 Chepstow road which cuts across the land. Elevations range from 200 metres (660 ft) in the north to 25 metres (82 ft) in the south.

== History ==
Llanbedr was bounded to the east and west by south-flowing streams from Kemeys Graig and to the south by the stream of which they were tributaries; to the north and east of it was the parish of Kemeys Inferior, the northern boundary being Coed-y-Caeru Lane. To the south is the hamlet of Llandevaud and to the east is the rest of the parish of Langstone. The fields and waterways which delineated the area still follow the same historical outline.

The ruins of St. Peter's church lie south of the A48 by Llanbedr Hall and were already in use as a barn in the late 19th century. Children of the hamlet used to attend school at Llandevaud. The house at Little Caerlicyn is recorded as a terrestrial Heritage Asset. On the opposite side of the stream boundary at the south are the remains of the old Llandevaud corn mill. Immediately northwest of the hamlet area across Coed-y-Caerau Lane are a series of scheduled monuments of Iron Age, Roman and WWII origin.

== Human geography and local government ==
Llanbedr is part of the ward of Bishton and Langstone in Newport, in the 'Langstone 3' area which had a population of 1356 in 2013. The crime rate and social deprivation indicators are very low. About 30% of households have dependent children and 21% are sole occupiers. Student performance is above average for the city of Newport.

The member of parliament for the area is Jessica Morden of the Labour Party, representing the Newport East constituency.

Langstone Primary School, which celebrated its 50th birthday in 2004, is located on the Old Roman Road.
