= Kemeys Commander =

Coordinates: 51.7383°N 2.9428°W

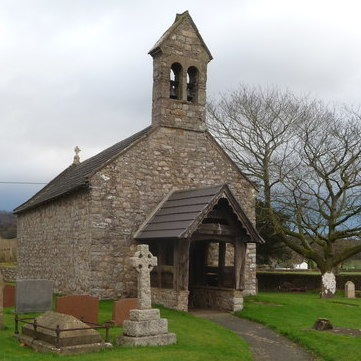
All Saints Church

Kemeys Commander (Welsh: Cemais Comawndwr) is a village in Monmouthshire, in South East Wales.

== Location ==
Kemeys Commander, 3 miles (4.8 km) north-west of Usk, comprises a few farms and cottages slightly off the main road leading to Abergavenny within a graceful bend of the River Usk. The village has the parish church of All Saints.

== Origin of the name ==
Its unusual name is derived from the fact that the patronage of the church was at one time held by the Knights Templar and was a commandery or preceptory, as their houses were termed. In the 16th century their successors, the Knights Hospitaller, drew £2 13s. 4d. per annum from demesne lands in this parish. There may have been a hermitage here in early days. It is, however, doubtful whether the Kemeys family ever held it, and they probably took their name from another Kemeys, Kemeys Inferior, nine miles (14 km) further down the River Usk. Both of these names are from the Welsh word cemais meaning 'bend in a river', and this is an apt description of the site of this village, which stands at the centre of a long bend of consistent radius.

Despite the fact that the family did not actually take their surname from here, it was "farmed" by Edward Kemeys, perhaps as chaplain of the chantry of St. Nicholas in the parish church of Usk; in 1603 it belonged to an Edward Morgan. In 1799 Archdeacon William Coxe came here during his Historical Tour in Monmouthshire (published 1801) and wrote "We here mounted our horses and rode through thickets across the fields to Kemeys Commander, a small village".

Coxe also visited the nearby village of Trostrey, recording of the church that its "situation is extremely wild and romantic; it stands ... remote from any inhabitation, and seems rather the solitary chapel of a hermit, than the church of a cultivated district."

== The church ==
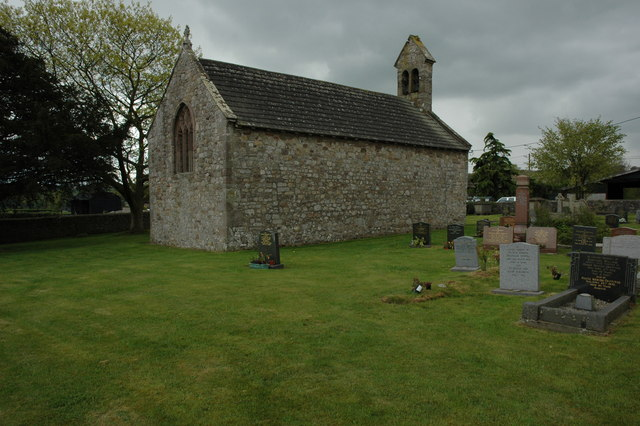
All Saints church

The Church of All Saints is held with Bettws Newydd nearby and has some interesting features.

A small, low screen divides the nave from the presbytery, taking the place of the usual chancel arch as the whole building is contained under one roof; the screen is plain and not of good workmanship, the only ornamentation being slight columns with crocketed pinnacles on each side of the entry. The altar slab, apparently not pre-Reformation, is severely mounted on plain stone squares and in keeping with the austere lines of the building. There are also a modern trefoiled aumbry and a piscina in the south wall. The east window is Perpendicular and high, and on the south side of the nave is an exceedingly small window which lighted the former rood loft. The beams of the slightly flattened barrel roof and the wall-plate are of some age. The font is octagonal.

The small south door has been built in, and entrance to the building is through the timbered west porch, above which is a turret containing two bells, one of which is of 13th-century date but slightly smaller than those at Gwernesney. Only the steps and base remain of the churchyard cross. In the middle of the 16th century, the provision of a light in the church, probably that before the high altar, was charged upon three acres of land in the parish. Church Farmhouse in the hamlet retains many features of the Renaissance period.

== Chain Bridge ==
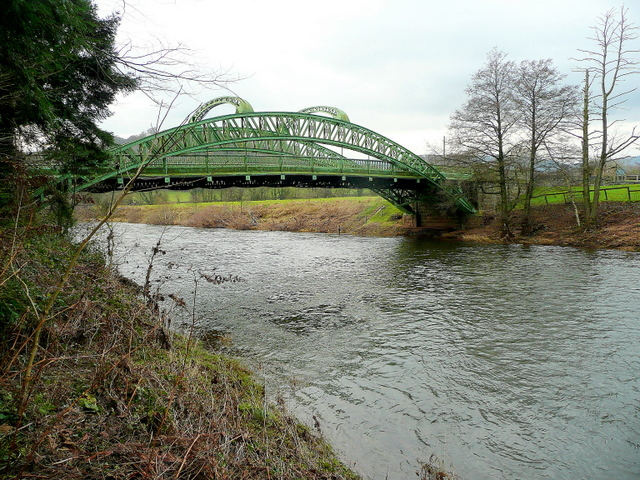
Chain Bridge

Chain Bridge, to the north of the village, takes the B4598 Usk to Abergavenny road over the River Usk. A bridge was here as early as the 16th century but was washed away in winter floods in 1690 and was eventually replaced, in 1730, by a solid oak structure known as Pont Kemeys. This bridge in turn was replaced, in 1829, by a chain bridge built by Brown Lenox of Pontypridd – supported by sturdy chains, hence the name. The current bridge, which was built between 1905 and 1906 by George Palmer of Neath, is an iron arch with green-painted girders which is still referred to as Chain Bridge.

The Centre for Ecology and Hydrology operates a river monitoring station at Chain Bridge which measures the river's flow rate.

== Kemeys Folly ==
Kemeys Folly is a former hunting lodge built in 1712 by George Kemeys and rebuilt in the early 20th century as a home for the High Sheriff of Monmouthshire. It featured on the Channel 4 programme Grand Designs.
