= Kemeys Inferior =

Parish and hamlet in Newport, Wales

Coordinates: 51.6259°N 2.8905°W

Kemeys Inferior: Welsh: Cemais Isaf
- Parish
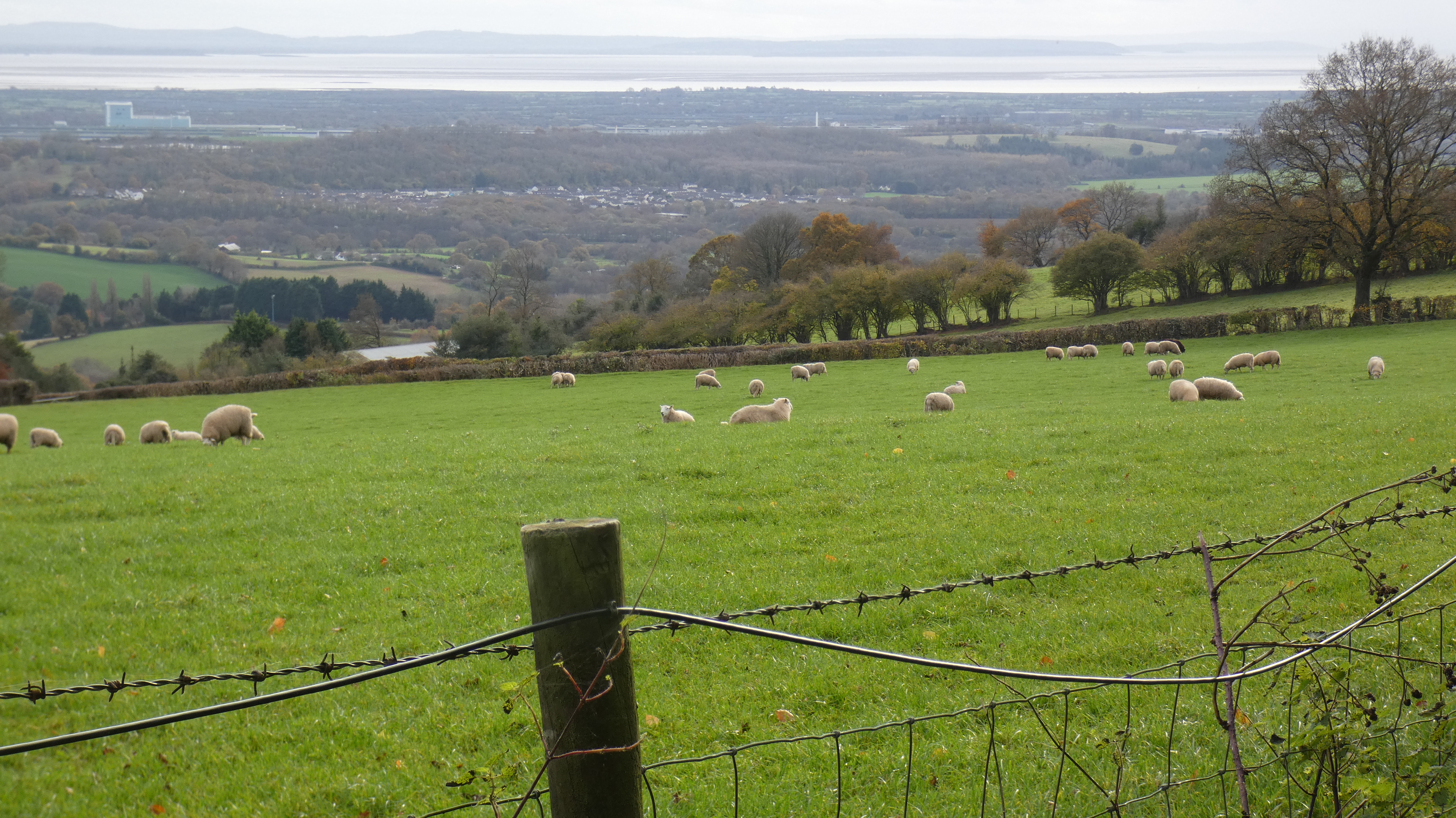
- Looking south across the southern part of the parish of Kemeys Inferior from Coed-y-Caerau Lane towards the Gwent Levels.

- Location within Newport
- Community: Langstone
- Principal area: Newport
- Country: Wales
- Sovereign state: United Kingdom
- Police: Gwent
- Fire: South Wales
- Ambulance: Welsh
- UK Parliament: Newport East

Kemeys Inferior (Welsh: Cemais Isaf) is a rural parish and hamlet of Newport, Wales, formerly part of the old county of Monmouthshire. It was the home of the Kemeys family from the Middle Ages until the 19th century. The parish contains a number of scheduled ancient monuments dating back to the Iron Age and listed buildings.

== Geography ==
The bedrock of the parish is largely Devonian Old Red Sandstone in the Brownstone group of which the dominant feature is the ridge of Kemeys Graig, consisting of mostly undivided sandstone with marl further down the slope on the Usk side; the flood plain of the Usk is marine or estuarine alluvium. The highest point of the parish is Caer Licyn at 241 metres (location: 51.33686, −2.37970). The largest percentage of the land is agricultural, of which the most fertile by the Usk. About 40% has tree cover, including Coed-y-Caerau (also the name of a hamlet) on Kemeys Graig, which joins Wentwood further east and is part of the largest ancient forest in Wales, which used to cover the area from the Usk to the Wye.

The wider parish area lies across and either side of Kemeys Graig and was part of the Usk Hundred and Caldicot Hundred. It is bounded by the meandering Usk to the northwest, Bulmore, Mount St. Albans and Catsash in the southeast, then centrally by Coed-y-Caerau Lane and the stream down from the hamlet of Great Caer-Licyn, turning roughly northwards along Hendrew Lane and then through the west of Wentwood until the Usk again. It is recorded as covering an area of 670 hectares (1656 acres).

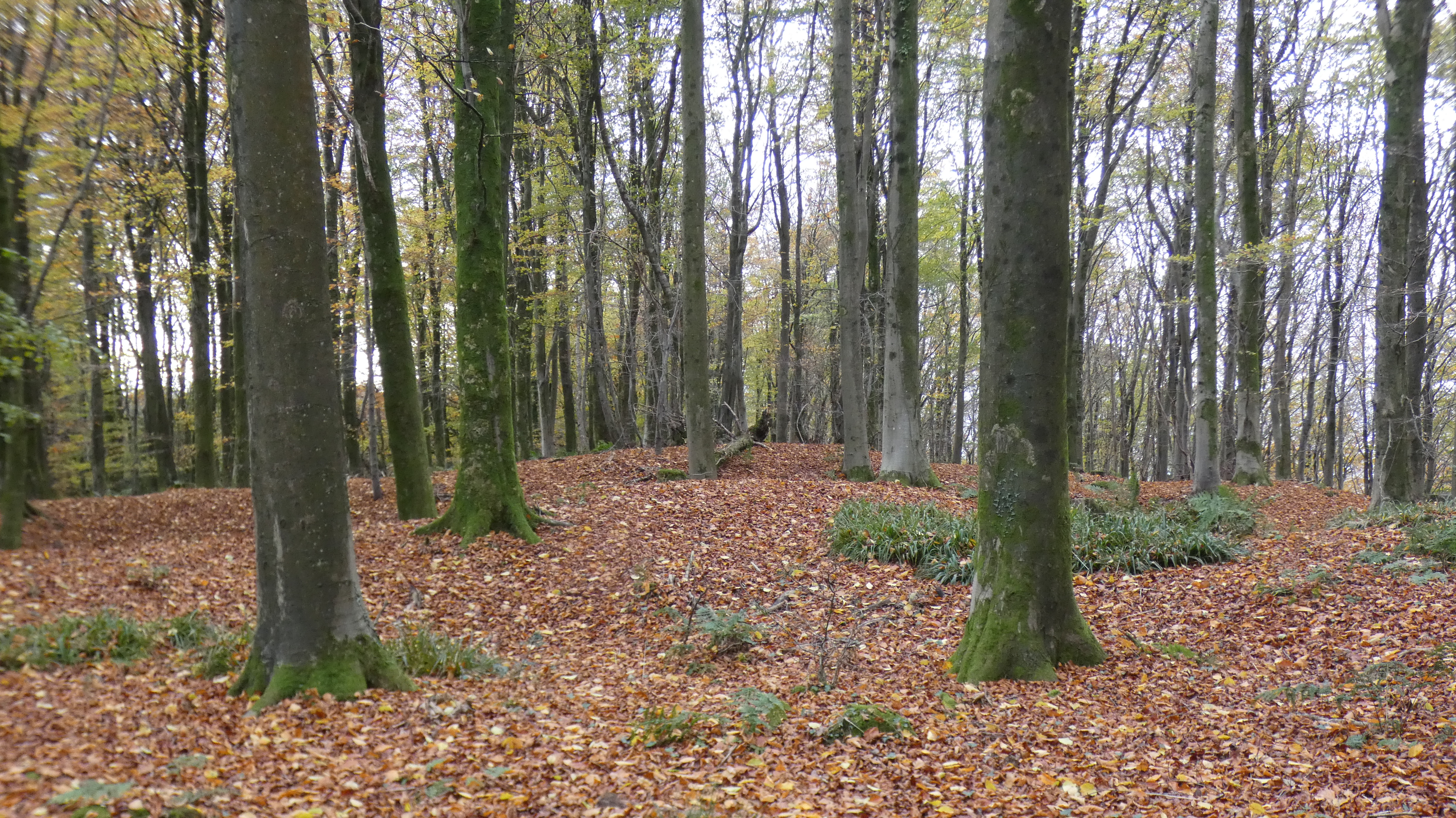
Summit of Caer Licyn, Newport, Wales.

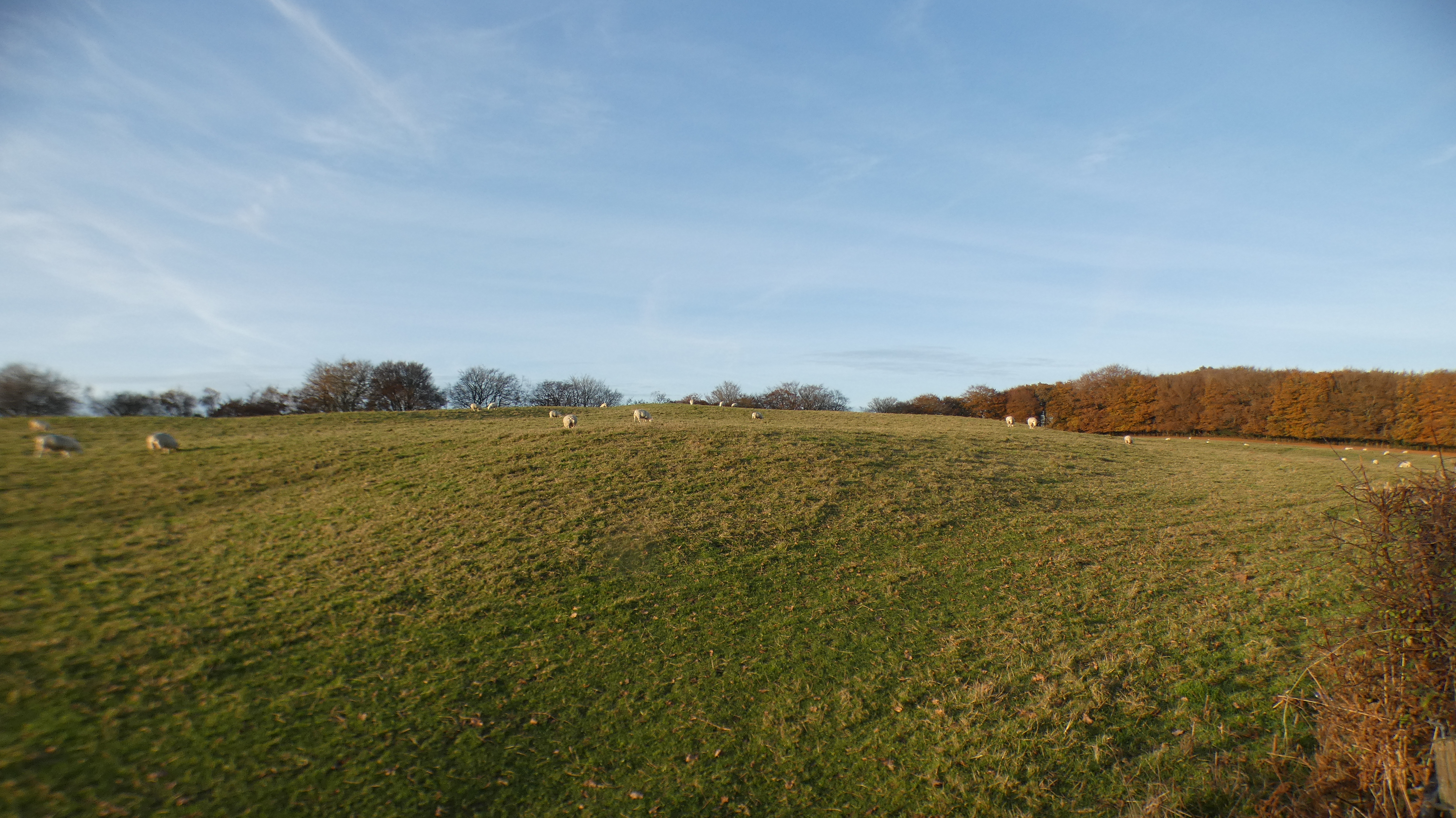
Pen-toppen-ash Iron Age enclosures.

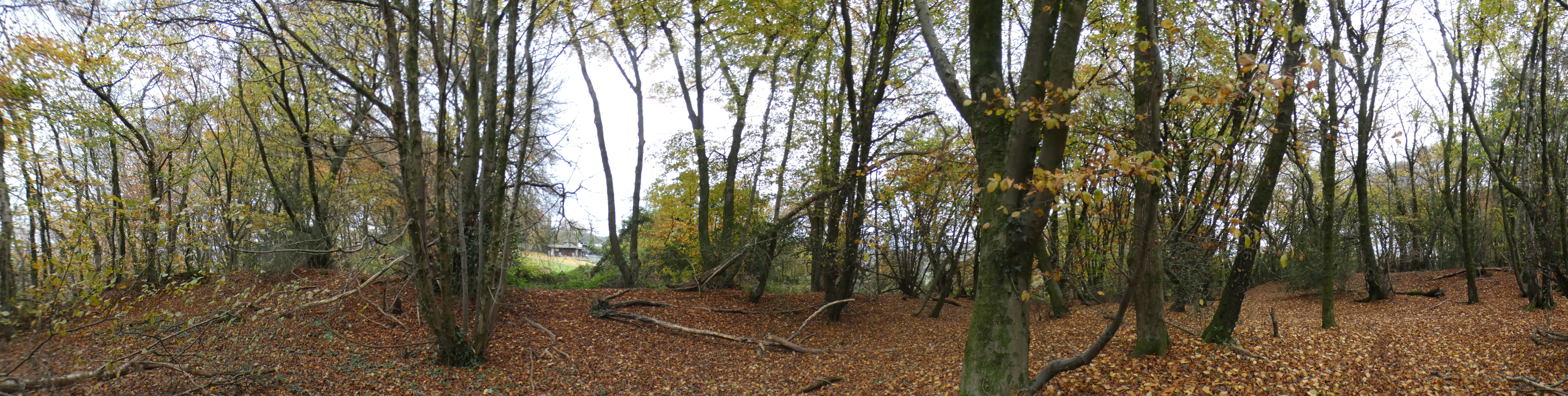
Panorama from NE to S shot from NW side within Kemeys Graig Roman Fort.

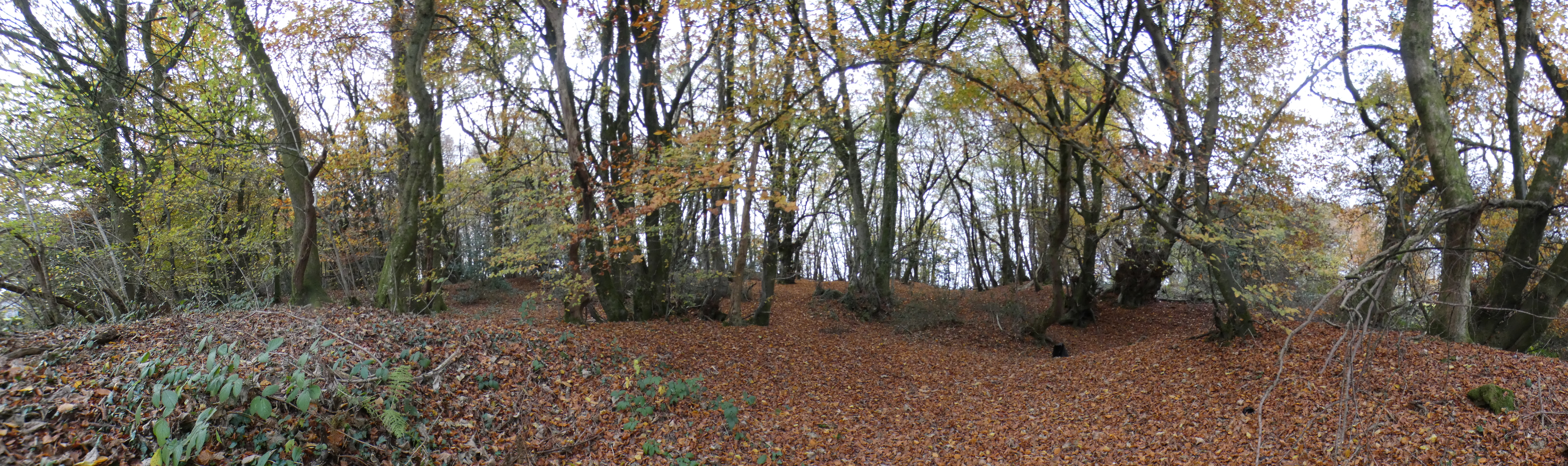
Panorama of Kemeys Graig Roman Fort centred on NW of earthworks shot from Coed-y-Caerau Lane.

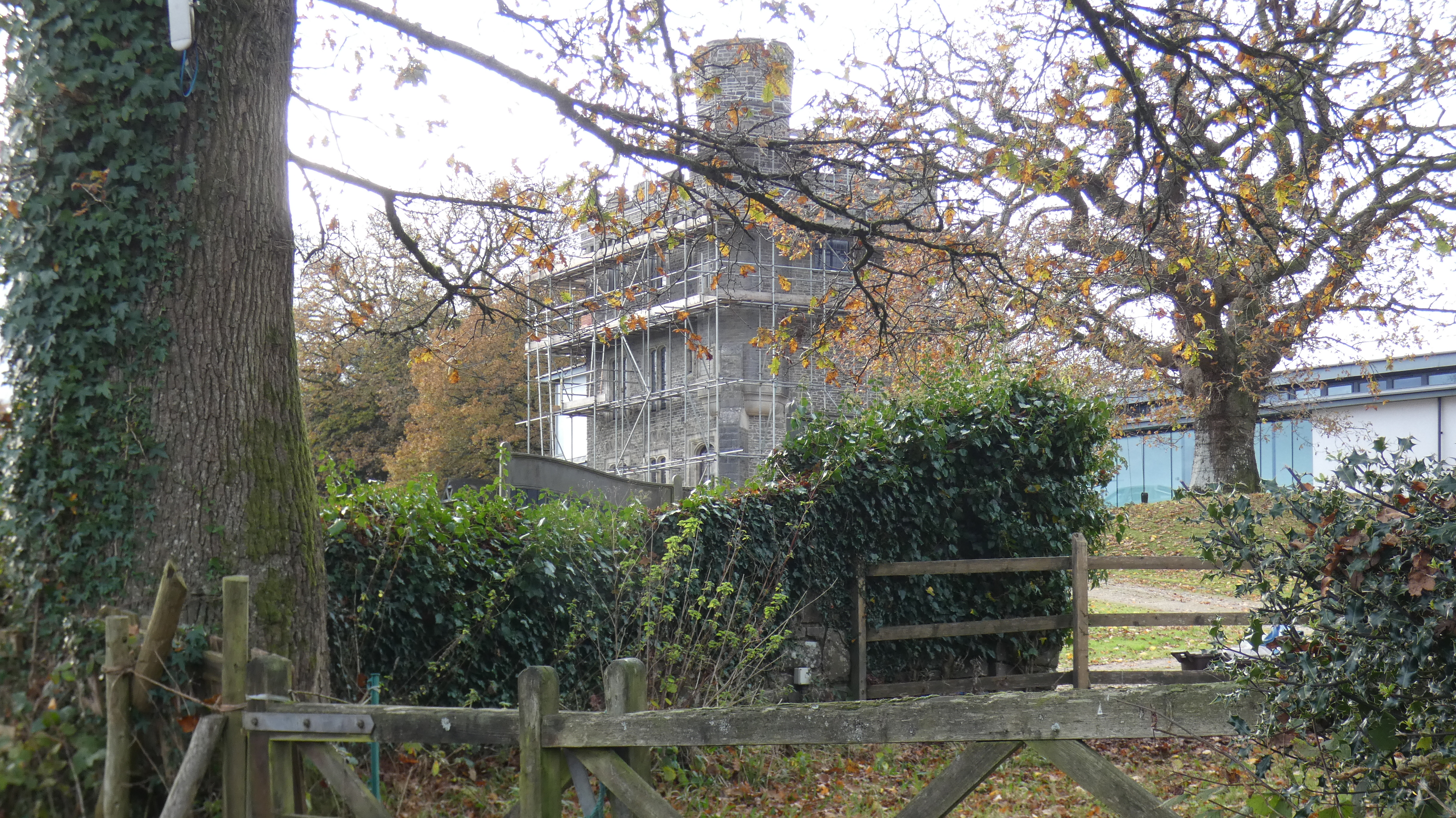
Kemeys Folly, built in 1712, from Coed-y-Caerau Lane.

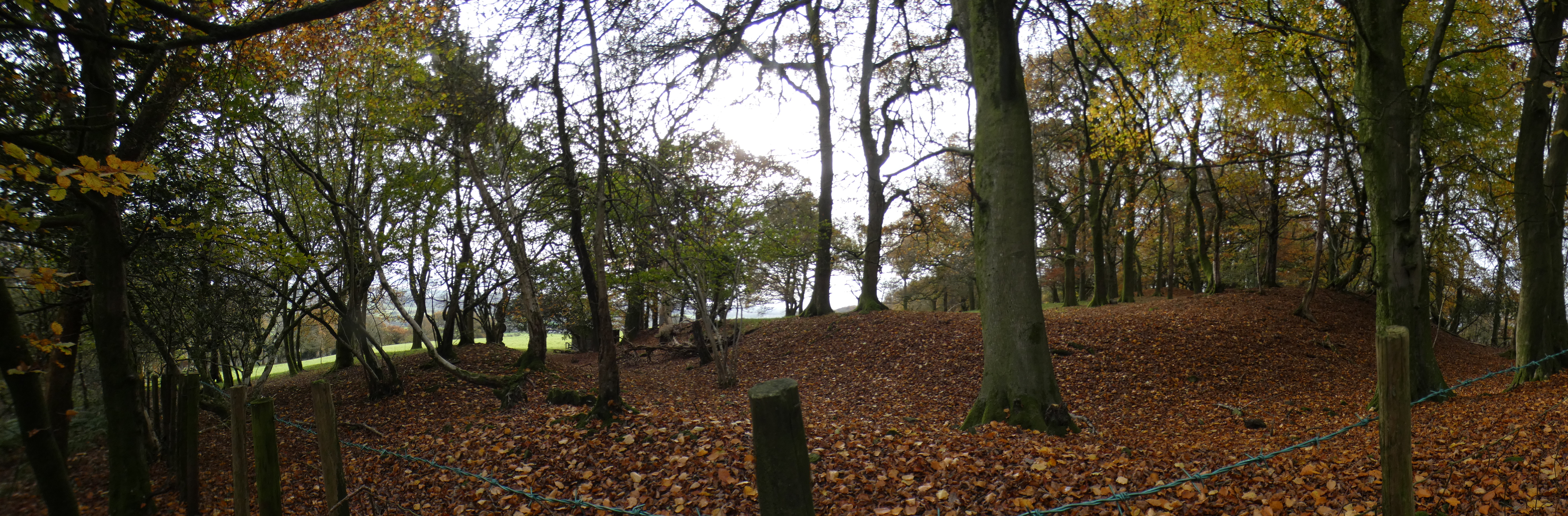
Panorama of Caer Licyn Motte, Iron Age or mediaeval earthwork, centred on SE.

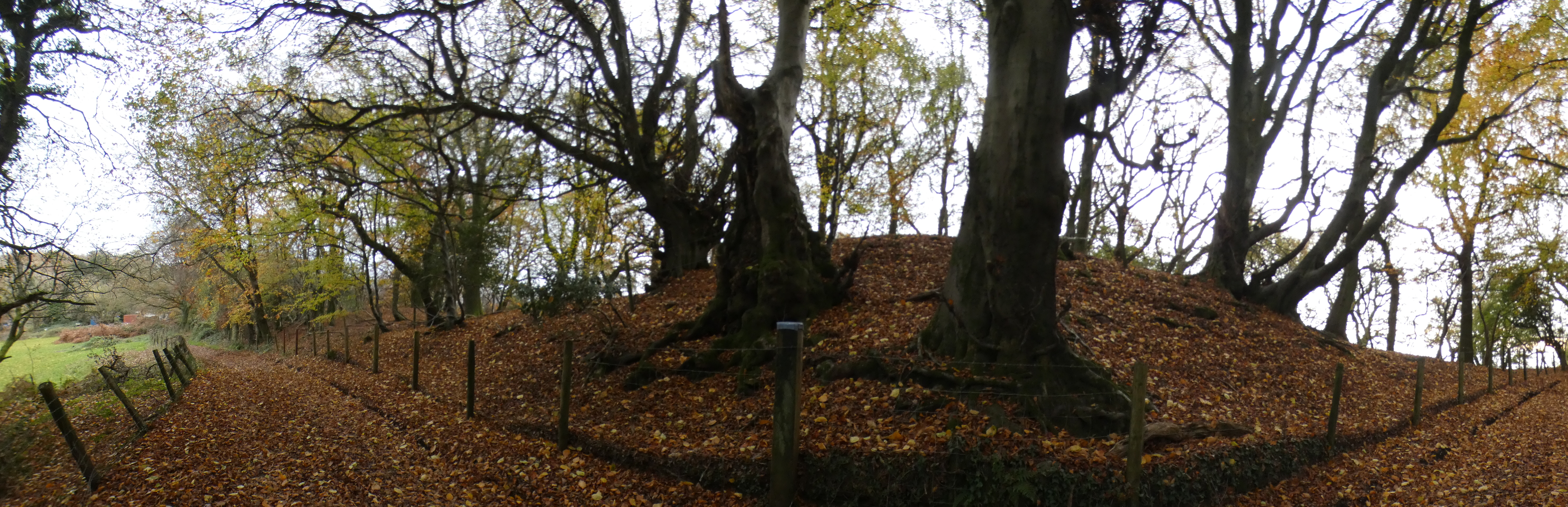
Panorama of Caer Licyn Motte, ENE to SSE, from Coed-y-Caerau Lane.

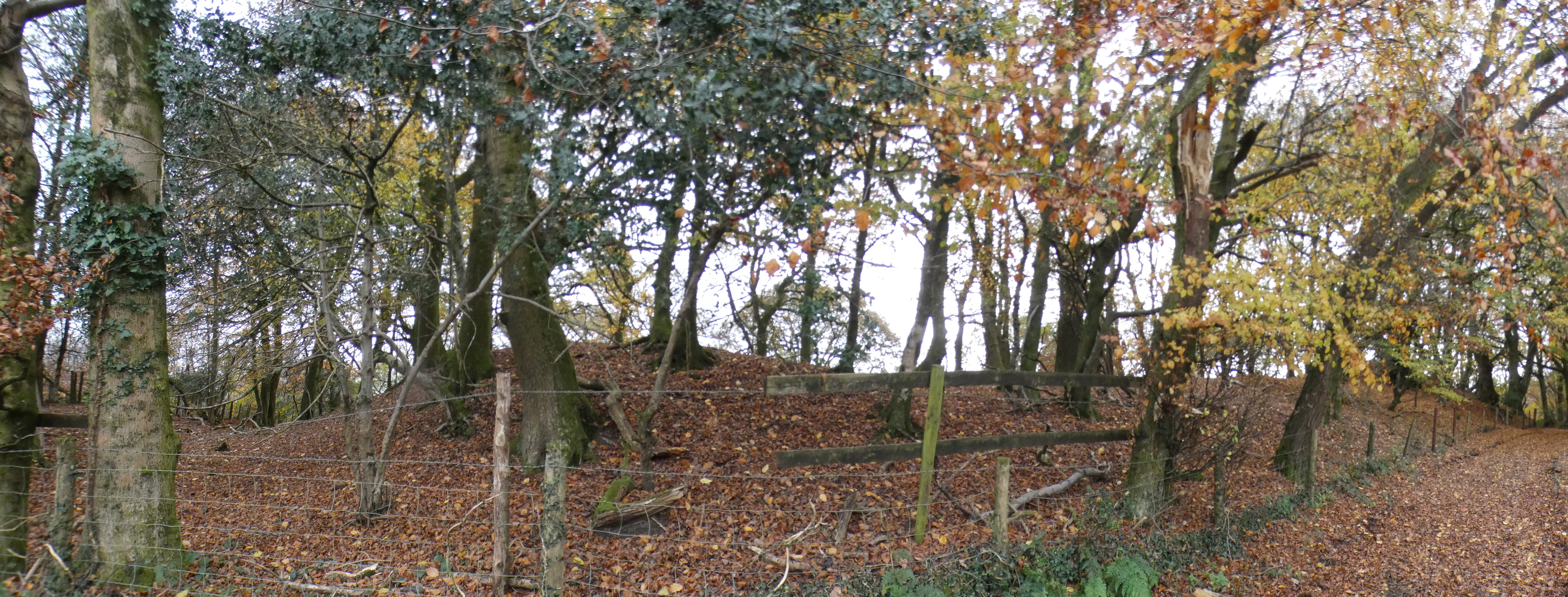
Panorama of Caer Licyn Motte, SSE to WSW.

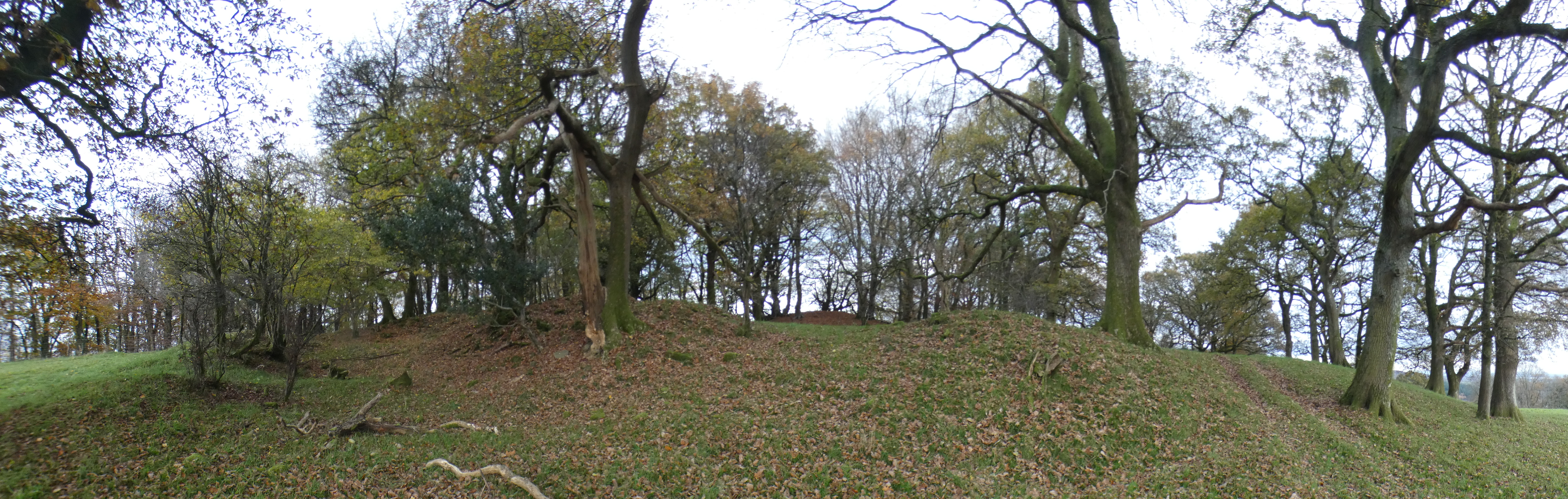
Panorama of Caer Licyn Motte, WNW to ESE.

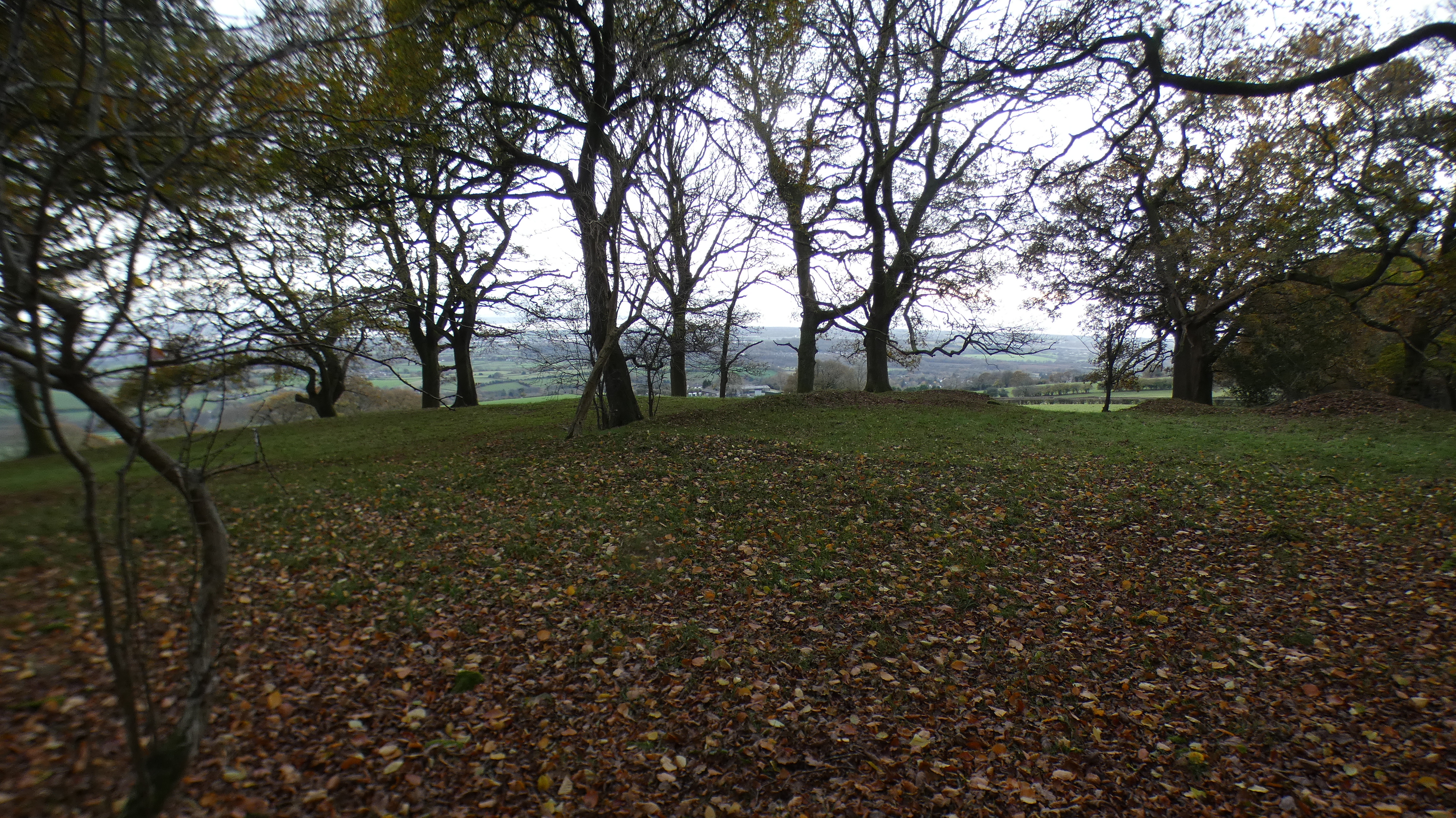
View from high point of Caer Licyn Motte.

== History ==
The area around Kemeys Graig, much of which is included in the parish, has been occupied for thousands of years. It has structures going back to the late prehistoric period, with Iron Age, Roman and mediaeval defensive earthworks extant. Pen-toppen-ash, a series of ringfort earthworks from the Iron Age which was re-used in the Roman era, is adjacent to the parish immediately southwest of Coed-y-Caerau (woods). Kemys Graig Roman Fort, now within Coed-y-Caerau (woods), is also on the ridge which overlooks the Usk to Caerleon on one side and the land southwest to the mouth of the Usk on the other. It's believed it might have been garrisoned to keep communication between Burrium Legionary Fort (in Usk) and early coastal military at Cardiff. There are several old quarries at a few sites, e.g. Abernant and within Coed-y-Caerau (woods), which were used throughout later centuries for paving and roofing at least.

A lordship of Kemeys existed in the Middle Ages. The Kemeys family was established in this part of southeast Wales by the 13th century. The family was associated with the area for generations until George Kemeys, who was the local sheriff in 1699, sold the family estate some years afterwards. The parish lay in the county court district of Usk and the diocese of Llandaff. Kemeys House (later Kemeys Manor) has elements such as the tower which date to the 13th century, of a green stone presumably from a local quarry. Extensions and additions were made up to the 20th century. Much of the parish land was owned later by the Duke of Beaufort and the provost of Eton College.

A mediaeval wooden cross (now in the National Museum) from the rood screen of the very small Kemeys Inferior church of the same period – All Saints church – was found by restorers in the 19th century; dated to the late 13th century, it was apparently concealed during the Reformation and depicts a mid-point in the development of the imagery of the crucifixion from Jesus as God (Christus victor) to Jesus as a person (Christus patiens). The church itself was dismantled in 1961 during construction of the A449 and a portion of its stones reused in the choir of Newport Cathedral (St. Woolos Cathedral).

== Scheduled monuments and listed buildings ==
Kemeys Inferior Motte (location:51.64092, -2.88351) – the remains of a mediaeval motte and bailey – lies at the very north of the parish area, right by the western side of the old Caerleon-to-Usk road on the slope down to the Usk. It is well overgrown with bushes and trees and part of it appears to have been lost to landslips.

Further west along the same road, on the eastern side, is the aforementioned Kemeys Manor (location: 51.62875, −2.89421), which is grade-II listed (the grounds and stone barn are also grade-II listed) and was the main dwelling of the historical Kemeys family. The remains of All Saints church (location: 51.62991, −2.89576) – the base of the walls, some flagstones and gravestones – lie to the west of the A466 on the slope northwest below the Manor and were scheduled in 1971. The Iron Age enclosures of Pen-toppen-ash (location: 51.6198, −2.8998) – best viewed from the air – are on the north side of Coed-y-Caerau Lane. To the northeast of this – and now part of Coed-y-Caerau (woods) – are the earthworks of Kemeys Graig Roman Fort (location: 51.62429, −2.89229).

There are three associated scheduled sites containing underground structures, rare examples of Auxiliary Unit constructions built in World War II to defend against Nazi invasion: an operational base (location: 51.6211, −2.8971, 35 metres diameter) and ammunition store (location: 51.6214, −2.8967, 20 metres diameter) – both in the woods on the northeast side of Pen-toppen-ash – and a 'special duties section' (location: 51.6186, −2.9018, 20 metres square) on the very northwest edge of Pen-toppen-ash.

Approximately 130 metres northeast of Kemeys Graig fort remains is Kemeys Folly (location: 51.62545, −2.89086), on Coed-y-Caerau Lane, south-southwest of Kemeys manor. Originally built as a hunting lodge by George Kemeys in 1712, it was sold and became a private home, was struck twice by lightning in the late 19th century, was burnt in 1910, rebuilt in 1911–12 with neo-Jacobean modifications and restored with a modern extension in the early 21st century; as the Manor, it is grade II listed.

Further up Coed-y-Caerau Lane on the south side, southwest of the high point of Caer Licyn and immediately before Wentwood Cottage is an earthwork which has been recorded as "Caer Licyn Motte" (location: 51.63100,-2.88303), was scheduled as a motte-and-bailey but it's considered might actually date from the Iron Age; most of it is overgrown with trees.

On the very western tip of the parish at Great Bulmore is the site of a Roman tomb discovered in 1815 in an orchard (location: 51.61922, −2.92563). The tombstones had been re-used for paving.

== Local government and demographics ==
The parish area is almost entirely within the Langstone Community council boundary of the city of Newport. It has a high percentage of detached, unshared dwellings, a low ranking for access to services and amenities and a good natural Open Space Provision compared to other places in Newport. Higher-level qualifications are more common among local people than in Newport or Wales and unemployment is low, as is social deprivation. School students achieve above the average for Wales. Only a small percentage of local people speak Welsh. The crime rate is very low.

Jessica Morden of the Labour Party is the member of parliament for the parish, representing the Newport East constituency.
