= Coed-y-Caerau =

Hamlet in Newport, Wales

Coordinates: 51.62113°N 2.89509°W

- Hamlet
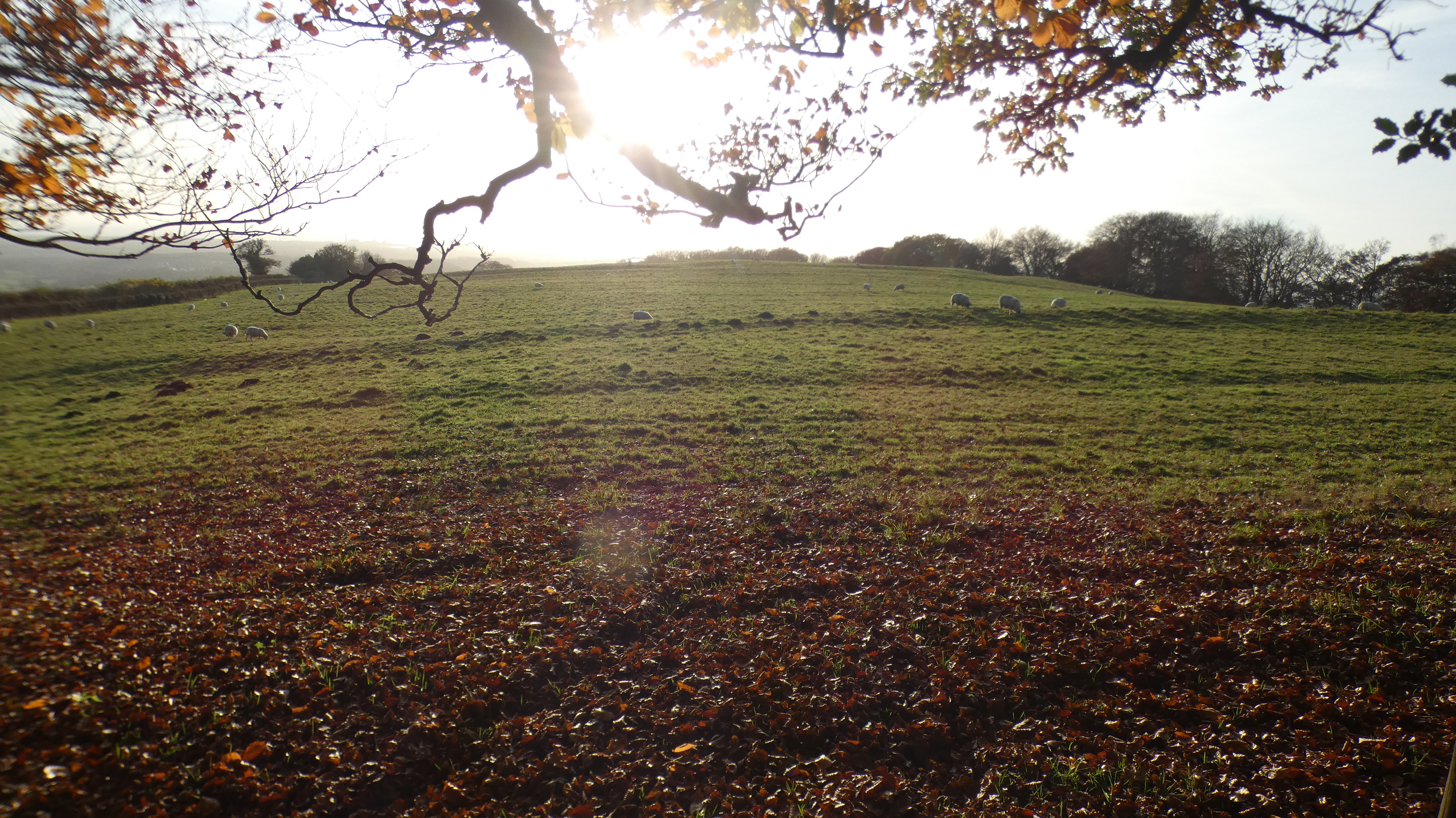
- Looking southwest across Iron Age and Roman military embankments (Pen-toppen Ash) from Coed-y-Caerau Woods. The parallel shadows delineate part of the northeastern rectangular earthwork.

- Location within Newport
- Community: Langstone
- Principal area: Newport
- Country: Wales
- Sovereign state: United Kingdom
- Police: Gwent
- Fire: South Wales
- Ambulance: Welsh
- UK Parliament: Newport East

Coed-y-Caerau (Welsh for 'wood of the forts') is a hamlet about 1,400 metres (4,600 ft) north of Langstone in Newport, Wales (Welsh: Casnewydd), historically in Monmouthshire (Welsh: Sir Fynwy). It is the site of prehistoric and Roman hillforts.

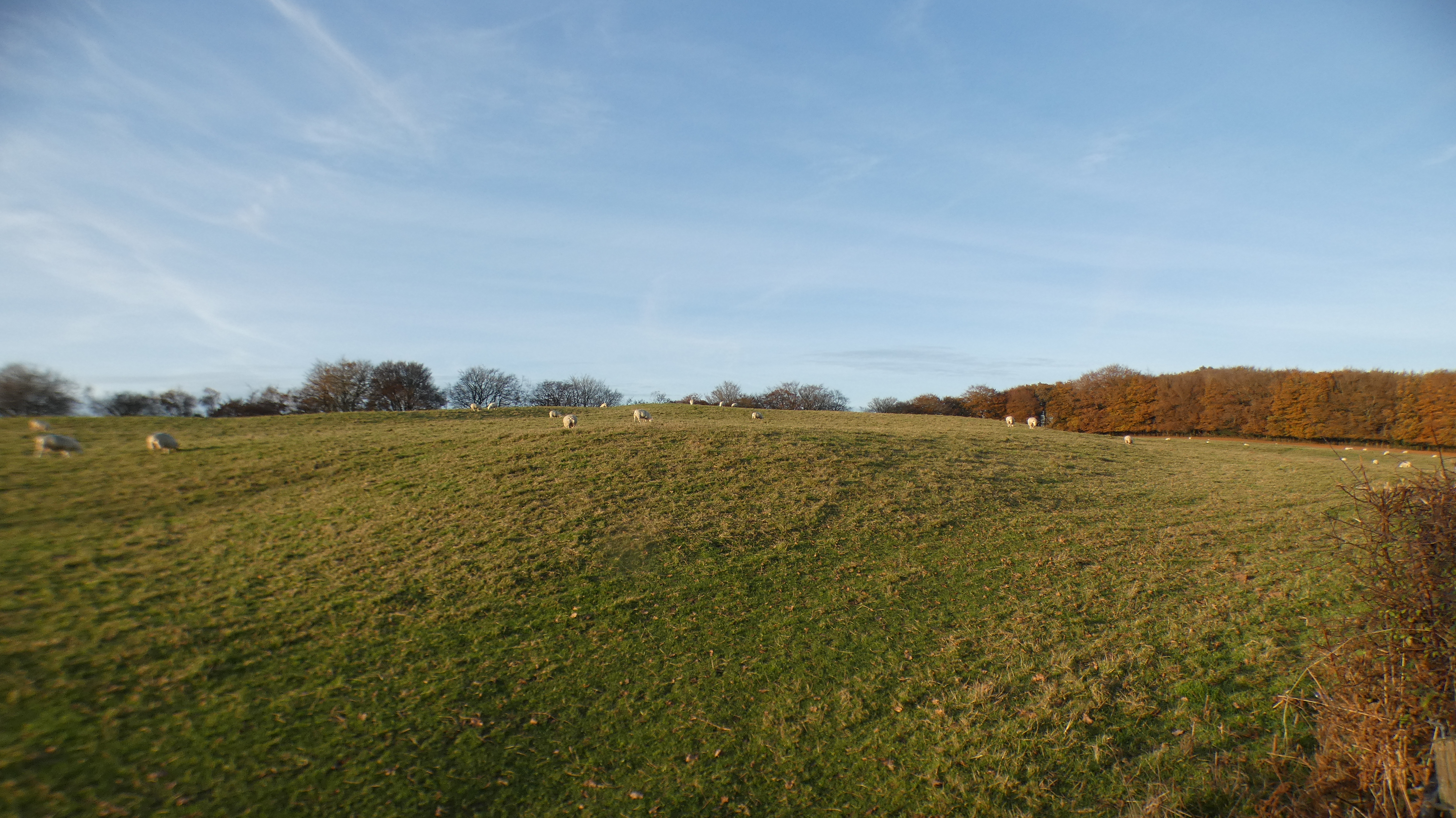
The central feature of the Iron Age earthworks from Coed-y-Caerau Lane. The closer banking is part of the outer concentric structure and the higher ground within is part of the inner banking.

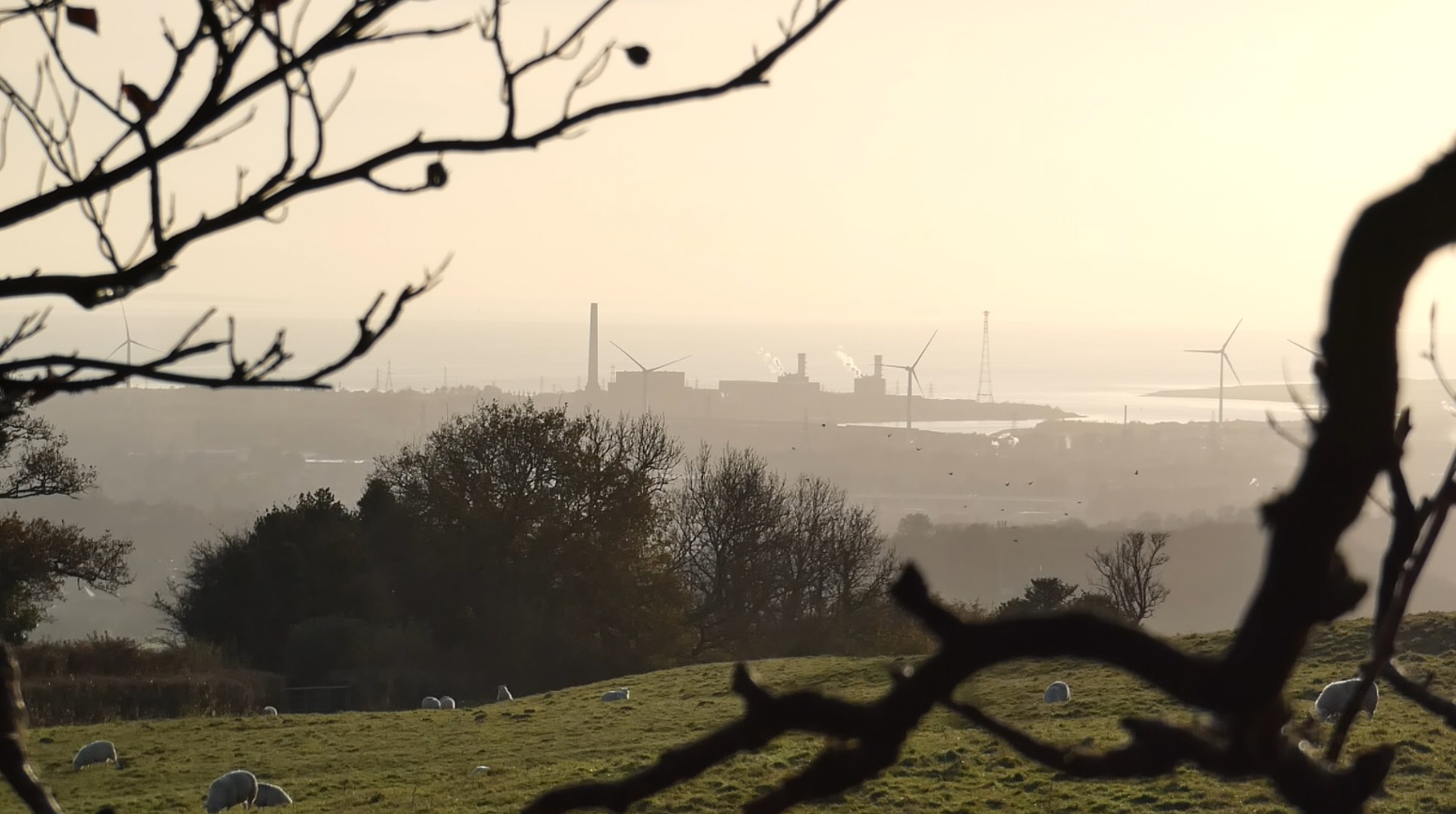
The mouth of the River Usk is still visible to the southwest from Coed-y-Caerau.

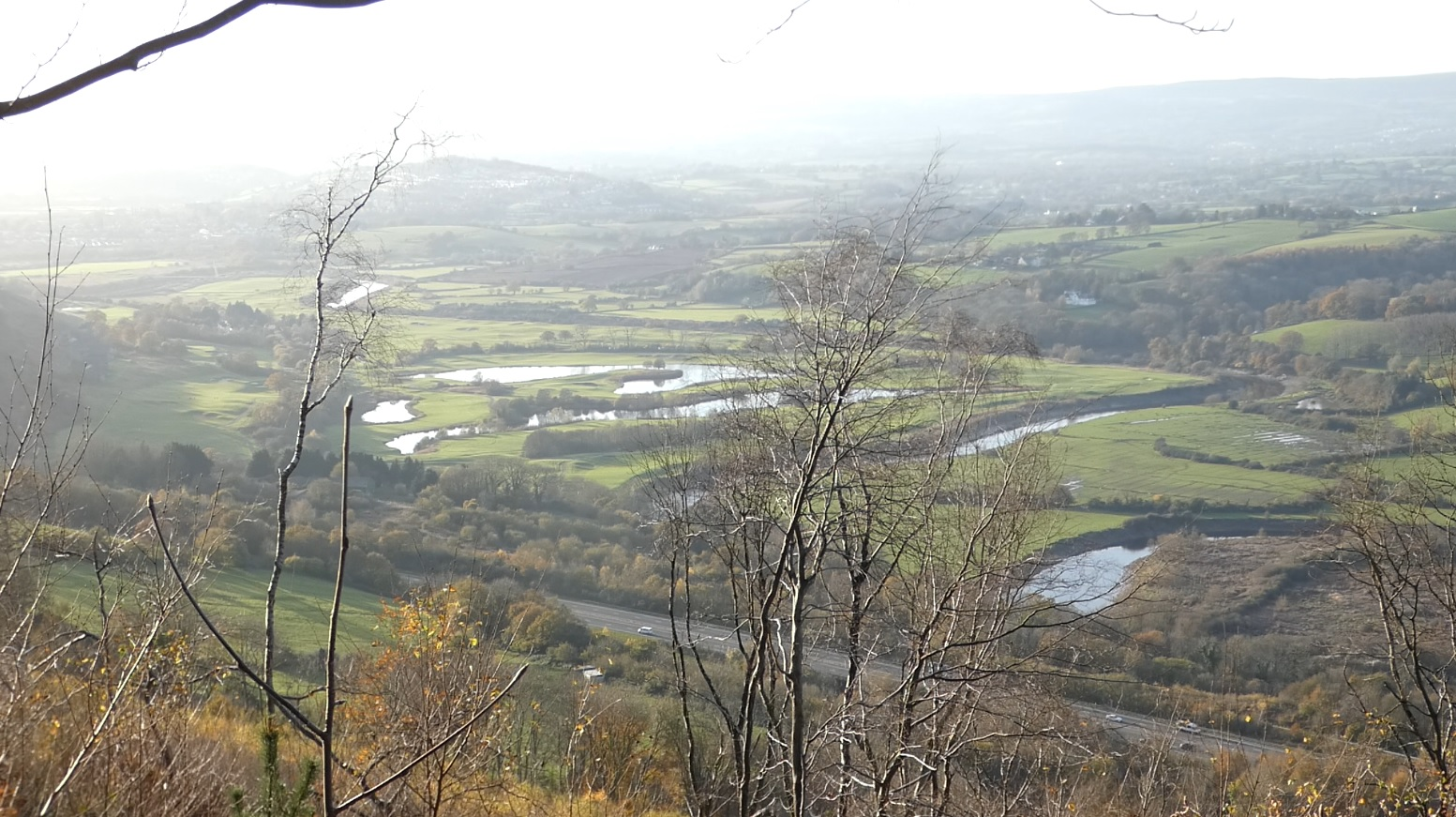
View looking west from Coed-y-Caerau Woods on Kemys Craig with the River Usk below and Roman Caerleon in the centre and left in the distance.

== History ==
Iron Age constructions are believed to have been re-used by the Roman military, specifically three connected and unexcavated earthworks just to the north-west of Coed-y-Caeru lane, often referred to in archaeological literature as Pen-toppen-ash (51.6198 north, -2.8998 east). The remains are a south-western oval enclosure about 90m across, a more circular central enclosure of a bank inside a concentric embankment linked to the south-western enclosure with entrances on the south-east and in the north-east, and a roughly rectangular north-eastern enclosure with rounded corners, 108m south-east to north-west and 96m on the other axis. The latter was previously considered to be a fortlet or watchtower because of its shape but now is thought to be from the Iron Age because of similar late prehistoric enclosures elsewhere in the UK. Around it is a further concentric feature about 166m square.

Immediately north of the earthworks is the remains of a Roman fortlet known as Kemys Craig Roman Fort, running 104m north-west to south-east by 99m, just over 1 hectare. A rampart, 6m wide and 1.2m high, is extant in places as are the remains of entrances in the north-west and south-west sides. It's considered likely the fortlet was contemporaneous with the Roman legion encampment at Usk. Strategically, Caerleon - site of the old Roman fortress of Isca Augusta and of an Iron Age hillfort - and the mouth of the River Usk can be seen from this point.

== Physical geography ==
The underlying rocks of Coed-y-Caerau are part of the Brownstone Formation of Old Red Sandstone which forms the crest of a ridge, Kemys Craig, running from south-west to north-east overlooking the River Usk to the north-west. After leaving the Old Roman Road, Coed-y-Caeru Lane follows the line of the ridge north-east for about 2700m towards Wentwood (Welsh: Coed Gwent). Some sources label Pen-toppen Ash (191m above sea-level) as a 'peak' however Ordnance Survey and other maps clearly show the local high point in Coed-y-Caerau Woods at over 210m with higher elevations to the northeast.

== Human geography and local government ==
Coed-y-Caerau is in the Newport ward of Bishton and Langstone, lying at the north of the 'Langstone 3' area which had a population of 1356 in 2013. The area is largely rural, reflected in a high percentage of detached, unshared dwellings; its ranking is low for access to services and amenities. Coed-y-Caerau has a very large natural Open Space Provision compared to elsewhere in the ward. Local people are more likely to have higher-level qualifications than in Newport or Wales and unemployment is low, around 1%. It has very low social deprivation. Approximately 30% of households have dependent children and school students perform well above the average for Wales. About 14% of people speak some Welsh, significantly lower than the national average. The crime rate is the lowest in Newport.

The member of parliament for Coed-y-Caerau is Jessica Morden of the Labour Party, representing the Newport East constituency.
