= Church Farmhouse, Kemeys Commander =

Farmhouse in Monmouthshire, Wales

Church Farmhouse
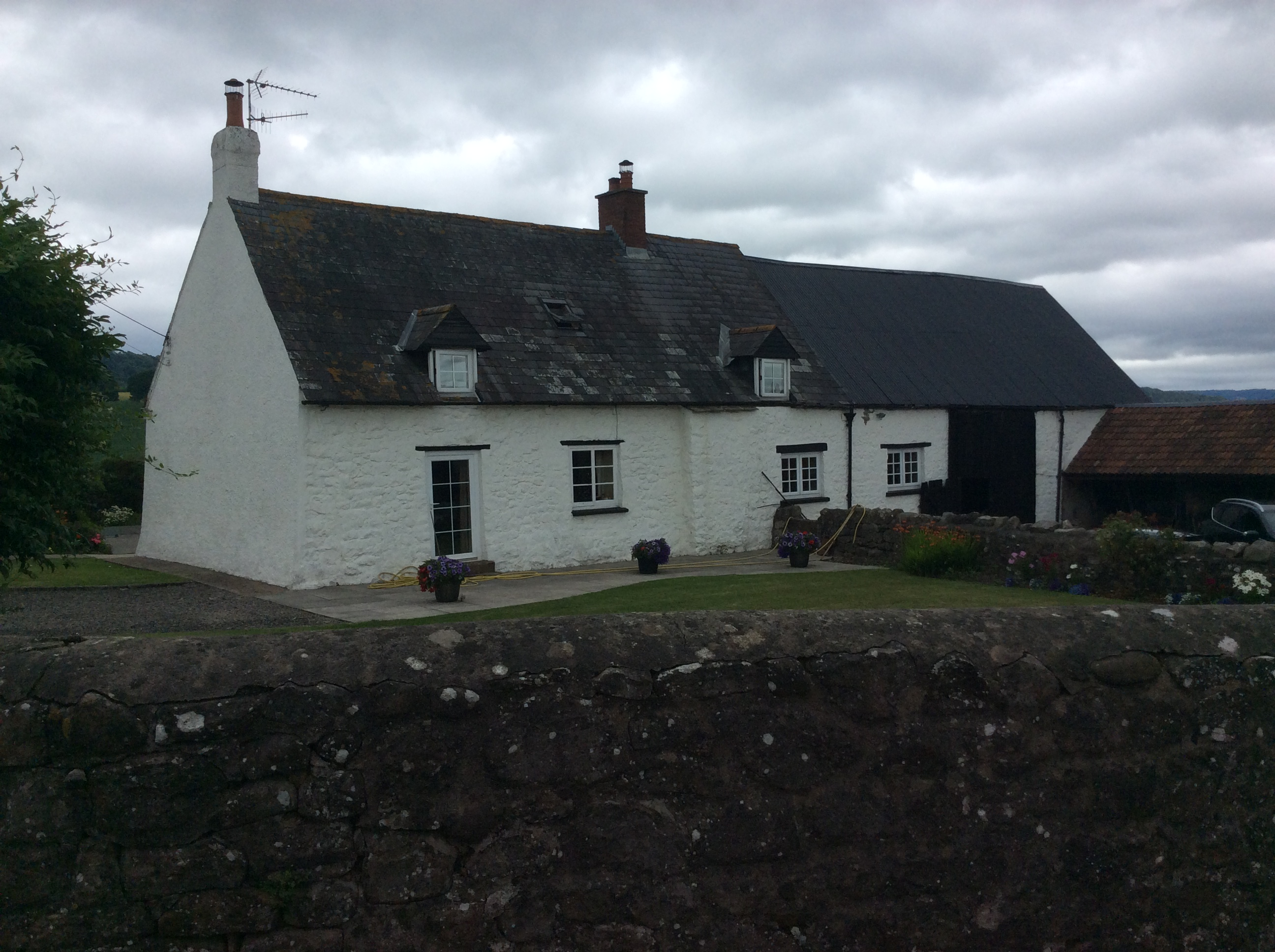
- "a well preserved 16th century farmhouse"

- Location within Monmouthshire
- 51.73742°N 2.94422°W
- Type: Farmhouse
- Location: Kemeys Commander, Monmouthshire

History
- Built: mid-16th century

Site notes
- Architectural style: Vernacular
- Governing body: Privately owned

Listed Building – Grade II*
- Official name: Church Farmhouse and attached barn
- Designated: 4 March 1952
- Reference no.: 2629

Church Farmhouse in Kemeys Commander, Monmouthshire, Wales, is a former parsonage dating from the mid-16th century. The farmhouse and the attached barn are Grade II* listed buildings.

== History ==
Sir Cyril Fox and Lord Raglan, in their three-volume study, Monmouthshire Houses, date Church Farmhouse to 1550–1560. The farmhouse was originally the parsonage to the adjacent Church of All Saints. On a tithe map of 1841, the farmhouse is recorded as being occupied by an Eleanor Morgan, who was farming 107 acres.

== Architecture and description ==
The building is a cruck-truss house but without the hall open to the roof, the more common style. It is constructed of whitewashed rubble. The building contains a Tudor door reused from nearby Allt-y-Bela. The attic partition has some, "now much faded", figure paintings of a man, a woman and a child. The farmhouse and its attached barn are Grade II* listed buildings, the listing describing the building as a “well-preserved 16th century farmhouse”.
