= Church of All Saints, Kemeys Commander =

Coordinates: 51.7381°N 2.9442°W

All Saints Church
- Church of All Saints
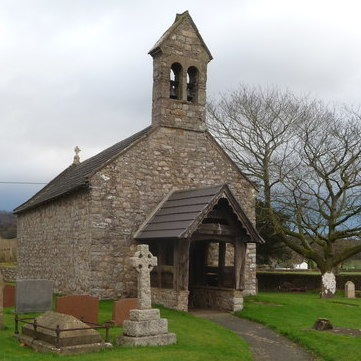
- The entrance and bell gable

- Location in Monmouthshire
- Location: Kemeys Commander, Monmouthshire
- Country: Wales
- Denomination: Church in Wales
- Website: Official website

History
- Status: Parish church
- Founded: c. 13th century

Architecture
- Functional status: Active
- Heritage designation: Grade II*
- Designated: 18 November 1980
- Architectural type: Church

Administration
- Diocese: Monmouth
- Archdeaconry: Monmouth
- Deanery: Raglan/Usk
- Parish: Heart of Monmouthshire Ministry Area

Clergy
- Rector: The Reverend Canon Sally Ingle-Gillis

The Church of All Saints, Kemeys Commander, Monmouthshire, Wales, is a parish church with its origins in the 13th century. It is a Grade II* listed building.

== History ==
The hamlets of Kemeys Commander and Kemeys Inferior formed part of the Monmouthshire estates of the Knights Templar. The Templars administered their holdings through commandery, accounting for the name of the hamlet. A reference to a church on the site dates from the 13th century, but the present building was constructed in the 15th century. The Lordship of Kemeys dates from the Middle Ages and was held by the Kemeys family until the estate was sold in the early 18th century.

The church was restored by Richard Creed in the late 19th century. At the time of the restoration, the vicar was The Rev. Herbert Sheppard M.A., of Clare College, Cambridge.

== Architecture and description ==
The church is built of local limestone in the Perpendicular style. The entrance is through a timber porch and under a bell gable. The building has suffered from subsidence and the bell gable is off-vertical.

The church retains its original medieval rood screen and rood beam, one of few churches in southeast Wales that do so.
