= Kemeys Inferior Motte =

Ancient monument in south Wales

Coordinates: 51.6406°N 2.8839°W

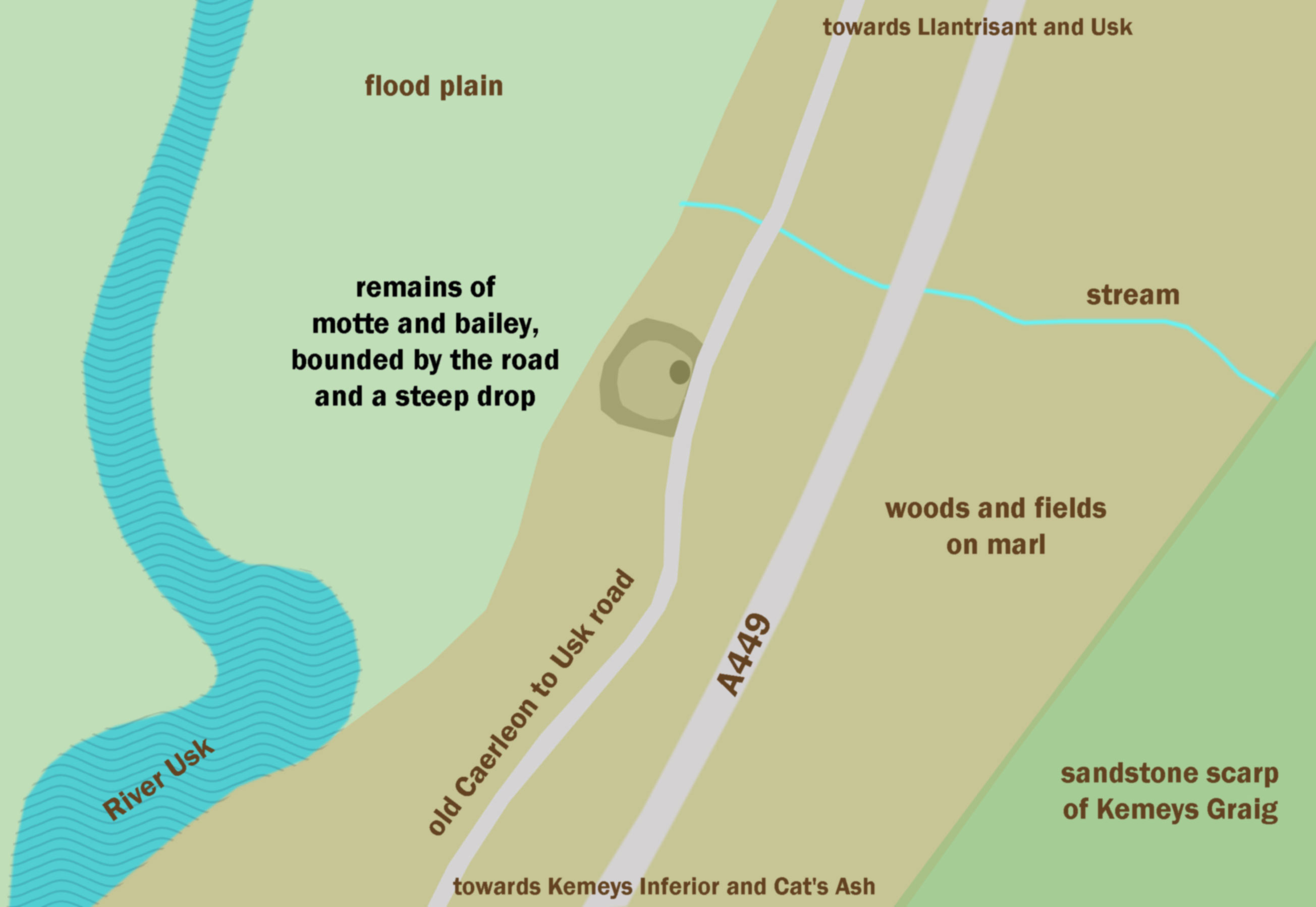
Map of location of Kemeys Inferior motte and bailey castle in the Usk valley, Newport, Wales.

Kemeys Inferior Motte (also documented as Kemys Motte, Gipsies Mount and Gipsies Tump) is the remains of a motte-and-bailey castle or ringwork structure located at the north of the parish of Kemeys Inferior, Newport, Wales. It has been a scheduled monument since 1931.

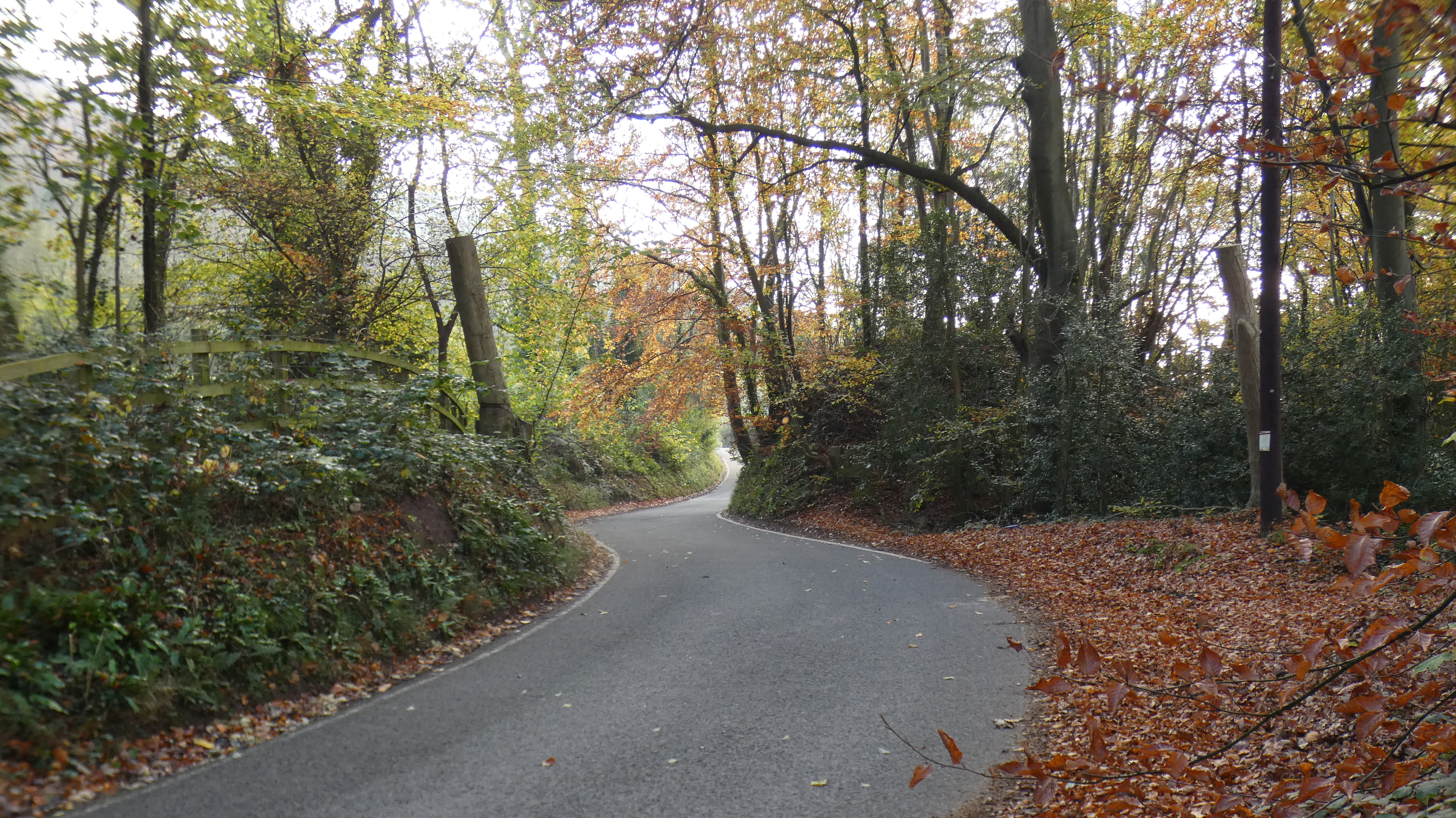
Kemeys Inferior Motte, with the mound on the right of the road, looking south-southwest.

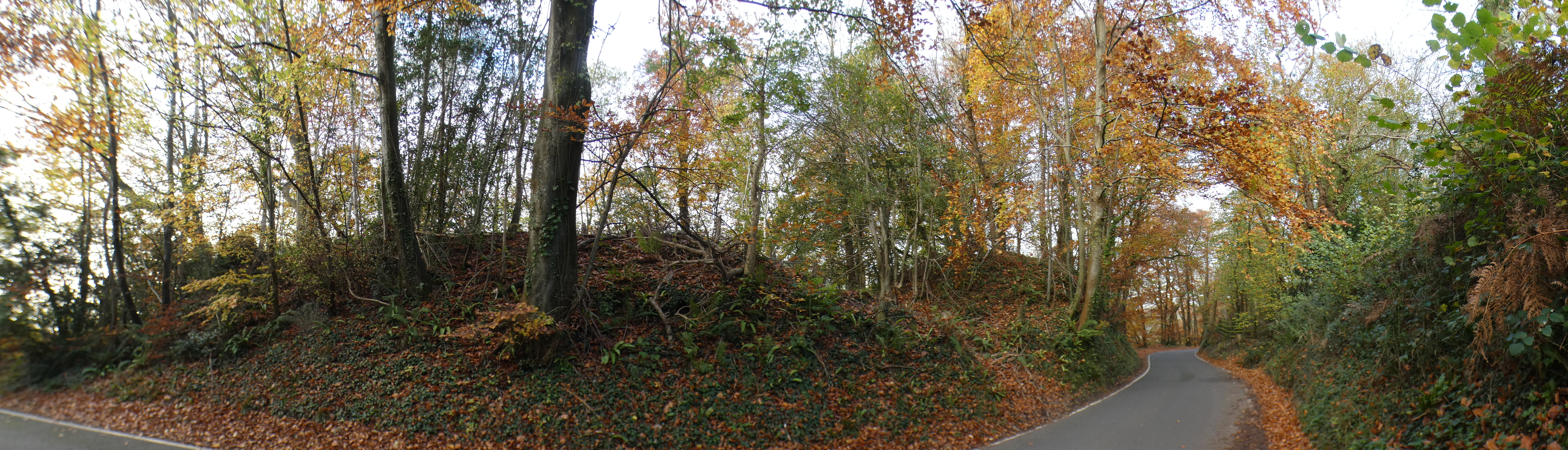
Panorama showing Kemeys Inferior motte and bailey site on the left of the road, with the southern banking on the left and centre of the image and the motte past the gap further along before the road turns.

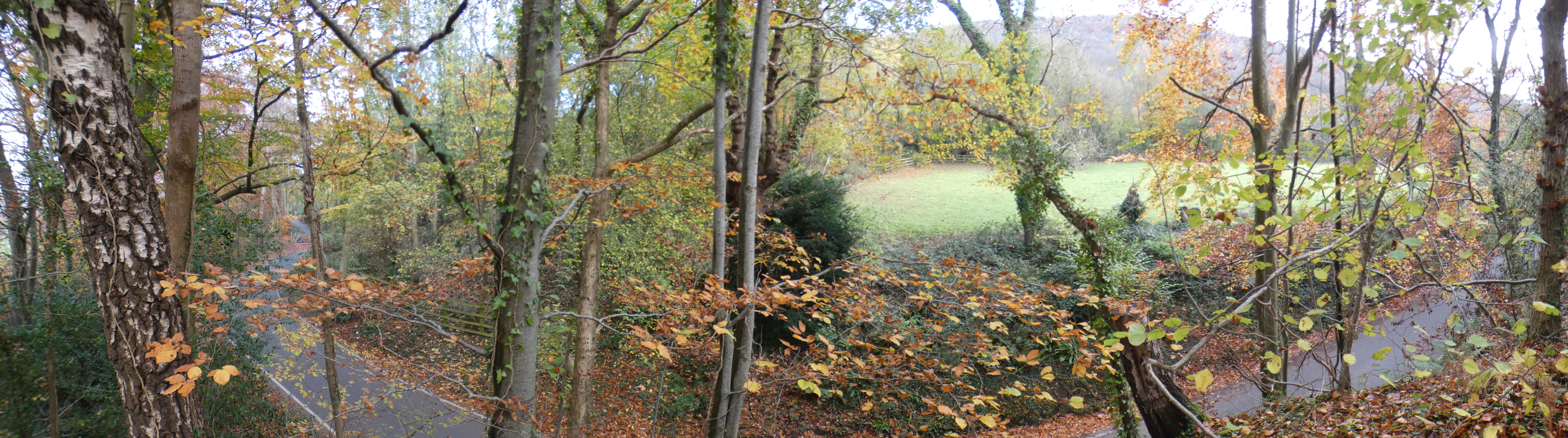
Panorama (approx. 150 degrees) from top of mound at Kemeys Inferior Motte, centred looking west-southwest to Kemeys Graig.

== Geography ==
The bedrock of the site is marl, below a sandstone ridge, at an elevation of 30 metres (location:51.64092, -2.88351). It is positioned towards the lower part of the steep valley slope below Kemeys (or Kemys) Graig, which runs southwest to northeast overlooking the site and River Usk below it to the west. The old Caerleon to Usk road cuts through the very eastern side of the site and the A449 passes about 70 metres further east.

== History ==
The earthwork is a motte-and-bailey castle built during the mediaeval period, consisting of a roughly-rectangular enclosure, 26 metres northwest-to-southeast by 18 metres. The mound is at the northeast of the enclosure, right by the road which follows a historical defensive ditch. The site appears to have been reduced in size by landslips on the sharply-dropping western side. The circular motte is steep, approximately 3 metres high and 7 metres in diameter. One source considers the motte as the remains of a late cutting through a partial and damaged ringwork, i.e. not defensive and with an unclear purpose. South of it is an approximately 2.5-metre-high bank which ends just before the edge of the slope, possibly indicating the entrance. There is a ditch on the south side of the slope approximately 2 metres wide and deep.

It has been interpreted as possibly having had a military tenant related to the Kemeys Manor, further south. Much of the extant earthworks are overgrown with trees and bushes. 12th-13th-century pottery has been discovered at the location.
