= Kemeys Manor =

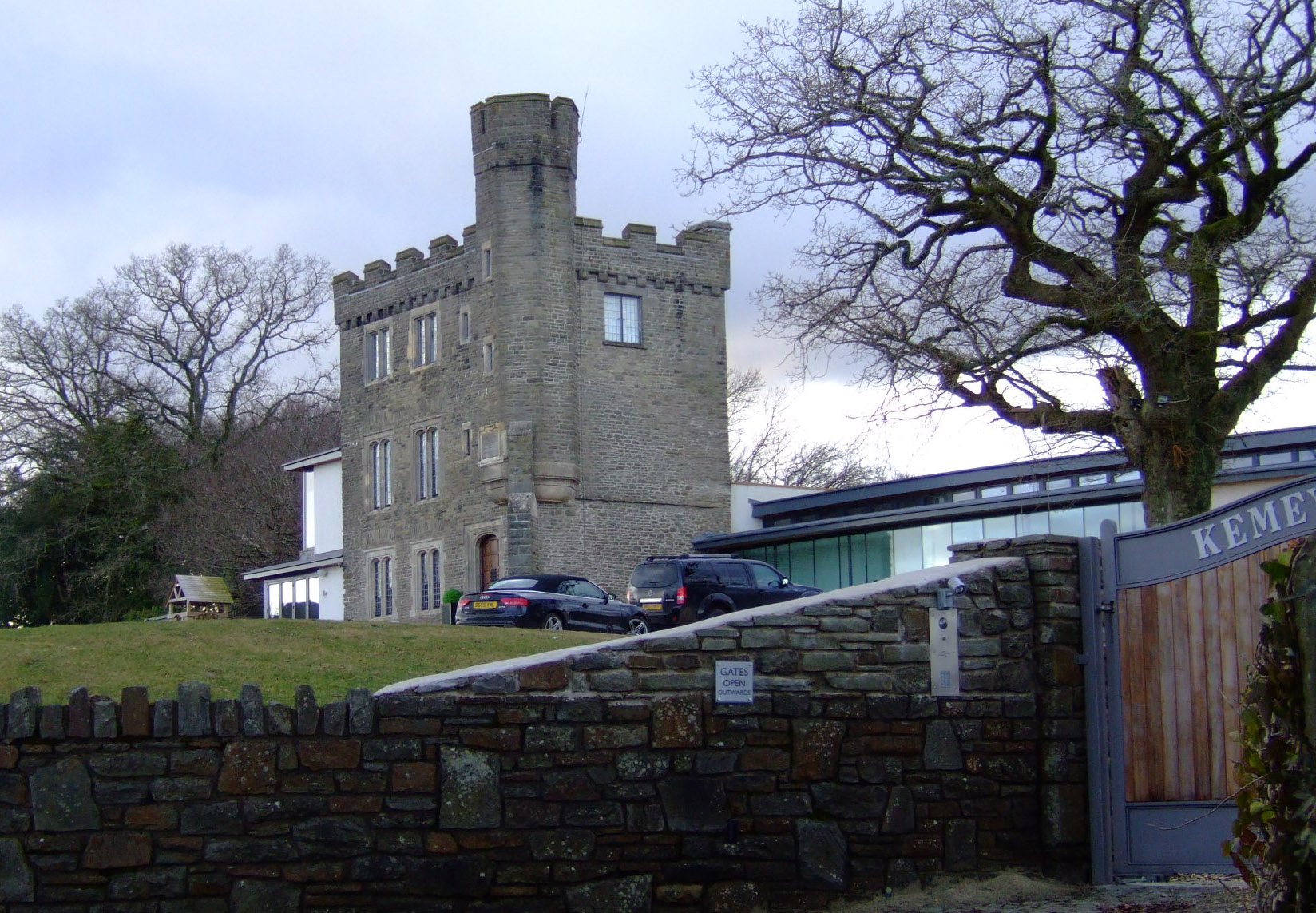
- Kemeys Folly - the manor itself is not visible from the public highway

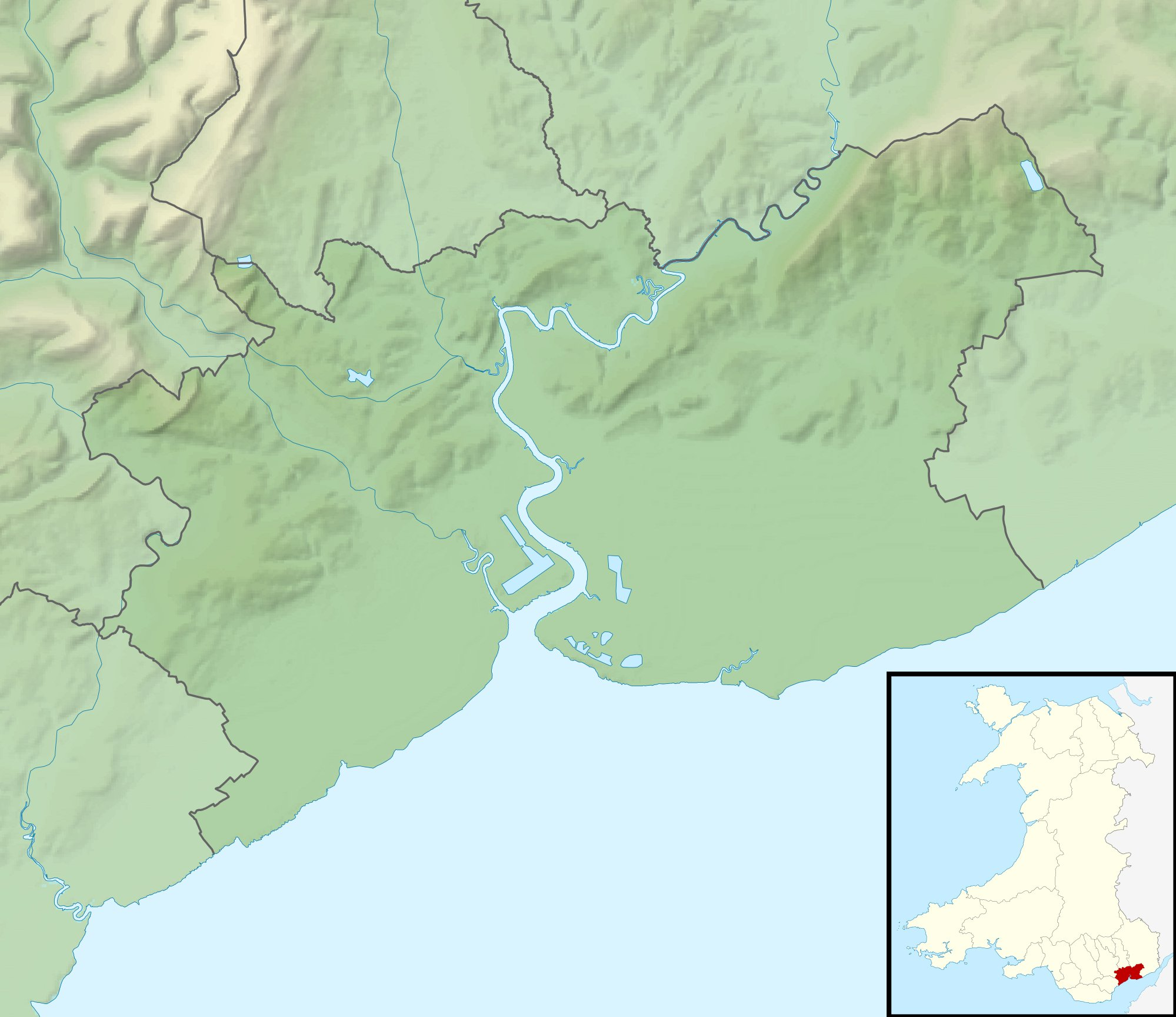
- Location within Newport
- 51.6288°N 2.8942°W
- Type: House
- Location: Langstone, Newport, Wales

History
- Built: 13th century

Site notes
- Architectural style: Vernacular
- Governing body: Privately owned

Listed Building – Grade II*
- Official name: Kemeys Manor
- Designated: 1 March 1963
- Reference no.: 2916

Listed Building – Grade II
- Official name: Barn to the north of Kemeys Manor
- Designated: 1 March 1963
- Reference no.: 2917

Listed Building – Grade II
- Official name: Kemeys Folly
- Designated: 19 December 1995
- Reference no.: 17072

Cadw/ICOMOS Register of Parks and Gardens of Special Historic Interest in Wales
- Official name: Kemeys House
- Designated: 1 February 2022
- Reference no.: PGW(Gt)50(Mon)
- Listing: Grade II

Kemeys Manor, Langstone, Newport, Wales, is a manor house dating from the 13th century. The family that built it was established in South Wales in the Middle Ages by Edward, Lord of Kemeys and the manor was held by his descendants until the 18th century. The building was greatly enlarged in the 16th and 17th centuries and comprises a tower, hall and attached ranges. Kemeys is a Grade II* listed building. A barn to the north of the house, and Kemeys Folly to the south, are both listed at Grade II. The park surrounding the house is listed Grade II on the Cadw/ICOMOS Register of Parks and Gardens of Special Historic Interest in Wales. The manor and the folly remain private residences and are not open to the public.

== History ==
Edward, Lord of Kemeys, established his family in South Wales in the early 13th century. Over the next five centuries the family married into many of the most prominent families in Monmouthshire and Glamorgan, and themselves became High Sheriffs of Monmouthshire. In the late 17th century George Kemeys constructed a folly to the south of the house as a hunting lodge, (Note: Cadw gives a slightly later date of 1722 for the construction of the folly.) before ending the 500-year connection between the house and the family by selling the estate in the early 18th century. The manor has subsequently had a number of owners, and the folly has been separated from the estate, having been converted to a house in 1911-1912 after a severe fire, and again rebuilt in the early 21st century.

=== Kemeys Folly ===
The folly is situated on an escarpment to the south of the house and offers views from both sides; to the north into Wales and to the south, across the Bristol Channel into Somerset. Archdeacon Coxe admired them and wrote a description in his two-volume, An Historical Tour in Monmouthshire, published in 1801; "Kemeys Folly comprehends a full prospect of the rich and extensive region on each side, combined into one grand and sublime view which is scarcely equalled in any other part of Monmouthshire." The author and illustrator Fred Hando also visited and wrote an article on the manor and folly for the South Wales Argus, subsequently published in his volume, The Pleasant Land of Gwent. Hando recorded the reputed exchange between George Kemeys and his uncle; "From it I can see eleven counties - Then eleven counties can see thy folly". Cadw’s listing record indicates that the reconstruction after the 1910 fire was carried out by T. E. Watson, a Newport colliery owner, as a memorial to John Lawrence and Horton Addams-Williams, but gives no further details regarding these individuals.

== Architecture and description ==
Cadw describes Kemeys Manor as a "well-preserved 16th century manor house". The architectural historian John Newman, in his Gwent/Monmouthshire volume of the Pevsner Buildings of Wales series, notes that the medieval origins of the house can still be seen in the base of the tower. The majority of the building is later, mainly dating from the 16th and 17th centuries, and comprises a hall with attached ranges. It is of two storeys with a slate roof and mullioned windows. Newman also records some "impressive" 17th century plasterwork in the interior of the house. Hando noted that the hall of the manor contained rows of pegs, used for stretching harp strings. (Note: Fred Hando also records the, somewhat improbable, story that a brook, and adjacent public footpath, ran from the folly, through the house and on to the church at Kemeys Inferior.) The Royal Commission on the Ancient and Historical Monuments of Wales records that the grounds of the house include walls and terraces from the Tudor period and are little altered from the time of their construction in the 16th century. The gardens are listed at Grade II on the Cadw/ICOMOS Register of Parks and Gardens of Special Historic Interest in Wales.

The folly is a square tower with a turret, both crenellated, and extensions dating from the early 21st century. Kemeys Manor is a Grade II* listed building. A barn to the north of the house, and the folly to the south, are both listed at Grade II.

== Sources ==
- Coxe, William (1995) [1801]. An Historical Tour of Monmouthshire: Volume 1. Cardiff: Merton Priory Press. ISBN 978-1-8989-3709-8. OCLC 34476778.
- Hando, Fred (1944). The Pleasant Land of Gwent. Newport: R. H. Johns Ltd. OCLC 2534151.
- Newman, John (2000). Gwent/Monmouthshire. The Buildings of Wales. London: Penguin. ISBN 0-14-071053-1.
