= Langstone, Newport =

Langstone
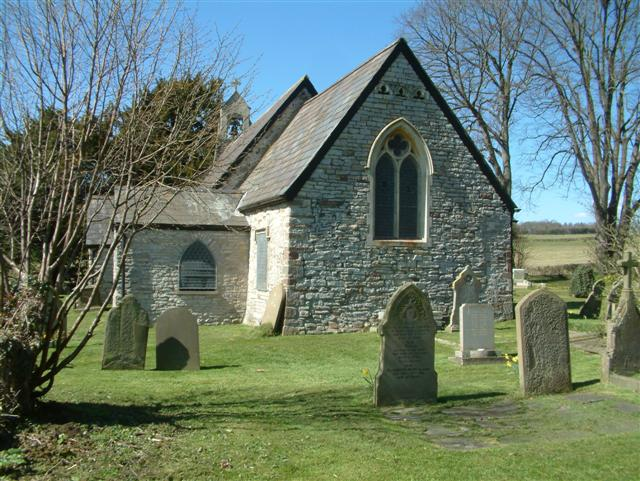
- Langstone parish church

- Location within Newport
- Population: 4,730 (2019 census)
- OS grid reference: ST386909
- Principal area: Newport
- Country: Wales
- Sovereign state: United Kingdom
- Post town: NEWPORT
- Postcode district: NP18
- Post town: CALDICOT
- Postcode district: NP26
- Dialling code: 01633
- Police: Gwent
- Fire: South Wales
- Ambulance: Welsh
- UK Parliament: Newport East
- Senedd Cymru – Welsh Parliament: Newport East
- List of places UK Wales Newport 51.60674°N 2.90096°W Map of the community

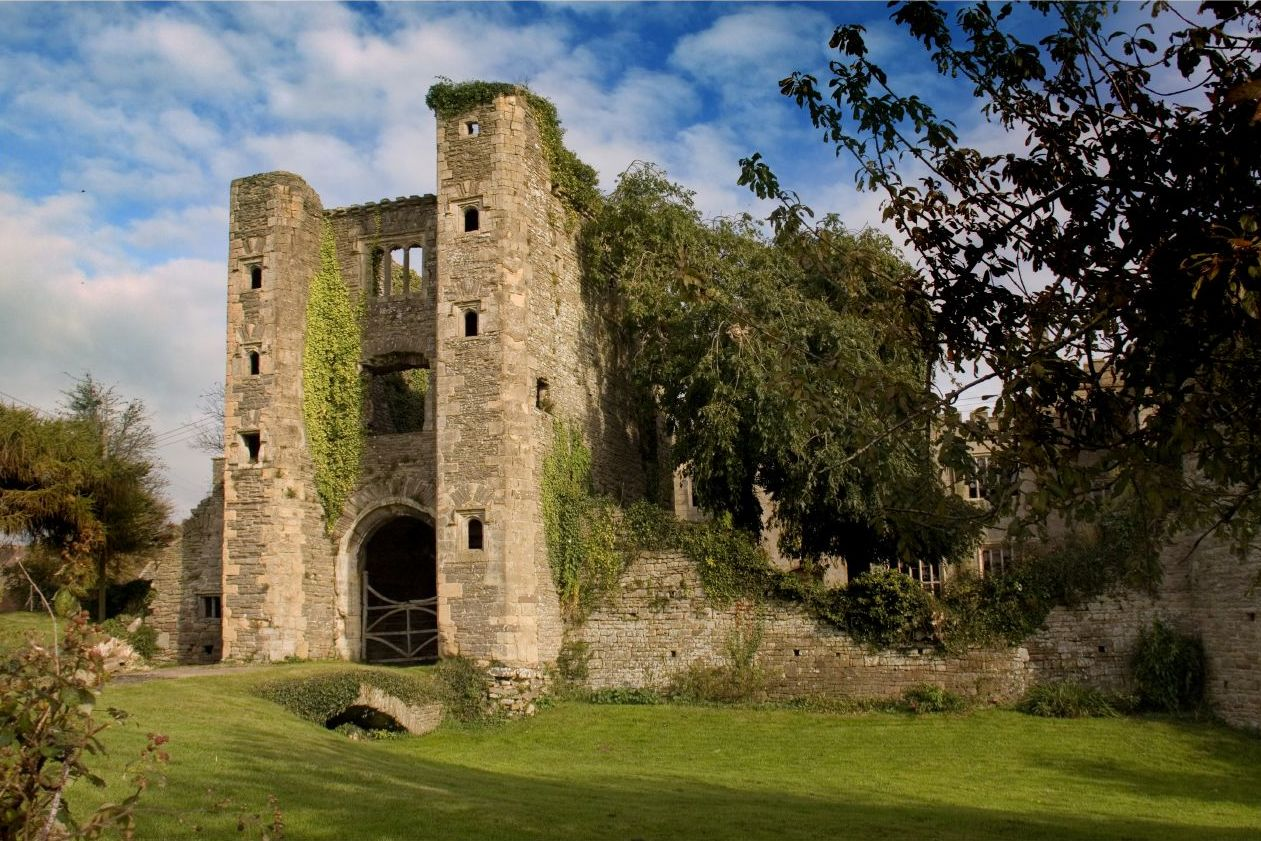
Pencoed Castle gatehouse

Langstone is a village and community of Newport, Wales. The community had a population of 4,730 in 2019.

== Location ==
Langstone is situated on the eastern edge of the city and is one of Newport's more affluent areas, less than a mile from Junction 24 of the M4 motorway. Some of the ward is hilly and heavily forested. It is bounded to the north and east by the city boundary, to the west by the Caerleon ward, and to the south-west by the Coldra and Llanwern wards.

== Development ==
The original village was a small linear settlement along the A48 (Chepstow Road) and its offshoot, Tregarn Road. Since the 1990s, many have moved to the area because of its appeal as being rural, but also minutes away from the M4 motorway. This population influx resulted in the construction of a large housing development at the bottom of Catsash Road, together with developments of housing estates, big and small, along Tregarn Road and Magor Road.

The community contains the hamlets of Llanbedr, Llandevaud and Llanmartin as well as Langstone itself.

== History ==
The actual village of Langstone (excluding the adjoining villages of Penhow-Parc Seymour, Llanvaches, Llandevaud, Llanbedr and Llanmartin) in 1801 had 126 inhabitants. By 1901 the population had risen to 206. The United Kingdom Census 2001 recorded the population as 3,905 people.

In 1891 Kelly's Directory of Monmouthshire noted that Llanbedr was a hamlet, one and a half miles north-east of the parish, on the road from Newport to Chepstow. It then had some remains of a church, which were then in agricultural use.

In July 2018, after a long period of warm dry weather, crop marks of a prehistoric or Roman farm near the village were revealed. The site was recorded by the Royal Commission on the Ancient and Historical Monuments of Wales (RCAHMW) before it disappeared again with the next rains.

The parish church dates from the 13th century. It was extended in both the 16th and 17th centuries, and restored in 1907. It is a Grade II listed building. It is part of the Netherwent Ministry Area. It has no known patron saint.

== Scheduled monuments ==
The following Scheduled ancient monuments are in the Langstone community:

- Kemeys Inferior Motte, motte and bailey castle
- Pen-toppen-ash prehistoric earthworks and possibly Roman marching camp
- Caer Licyn
- Pencoed Castle
- Langstone Villa moated site
- Langstone Mound and Bailey Castle - discovered in 1964 during construction of the M4 motorway.
- A round barrow 57 m (187 ft) south of Stock Wood
- All Saints' Church, Kemeys Inferior
- St Curig's chapel (remains of), Catsash
- Moated site 200 m (660 ft) south west of Court Farm
- Moated site 250 m (820 ft) south west of Pencoed Castle

Both Pencoed Castle and Penhow Castle fall within the ward boundaries of Langstone. Penhow Castle is privately owned. The area is also home to Penhow Quarry, owned by Hanson plc.

Fields of sheep at Catsash

== Governance ==
The Member of Parliament for Newport East, which includes Langstone, is Jessica Morden (Labour) who assumed office in 2005. The Member of the Senedd for Newport East is John Griffiths, who assumed office in 1999.

Since May 2022 Langstone has been part of the 'Bishton and Langstone' electoral ward, which elects two councillors to Newport City Council. The 2022 election resulted in the election of two Conservative (UK) councillors to represent the ward.

A ward called Langstone existed until 2022, which also covered the communities of Penhow and Llanvaches (ward population 2,770).

== Amenities ==
Langstone Primary School celebrated its 50th birthday in 2004, and currently has about 300 pupils. Until the 1970s the school intake stretched as far as Nash, Goldcliff, Whitson, Llanwern, Bishton and Llandevaud. The school is now serving simply Langstone and its surrounds.

Pupils receiving a Welsh-medium education have the Welsh-medium Ysgol Gymraeg Casnewydd in Newport as their local school.
