= Pen-toppen-ash =

Ancient earthworks in Newport, Wales

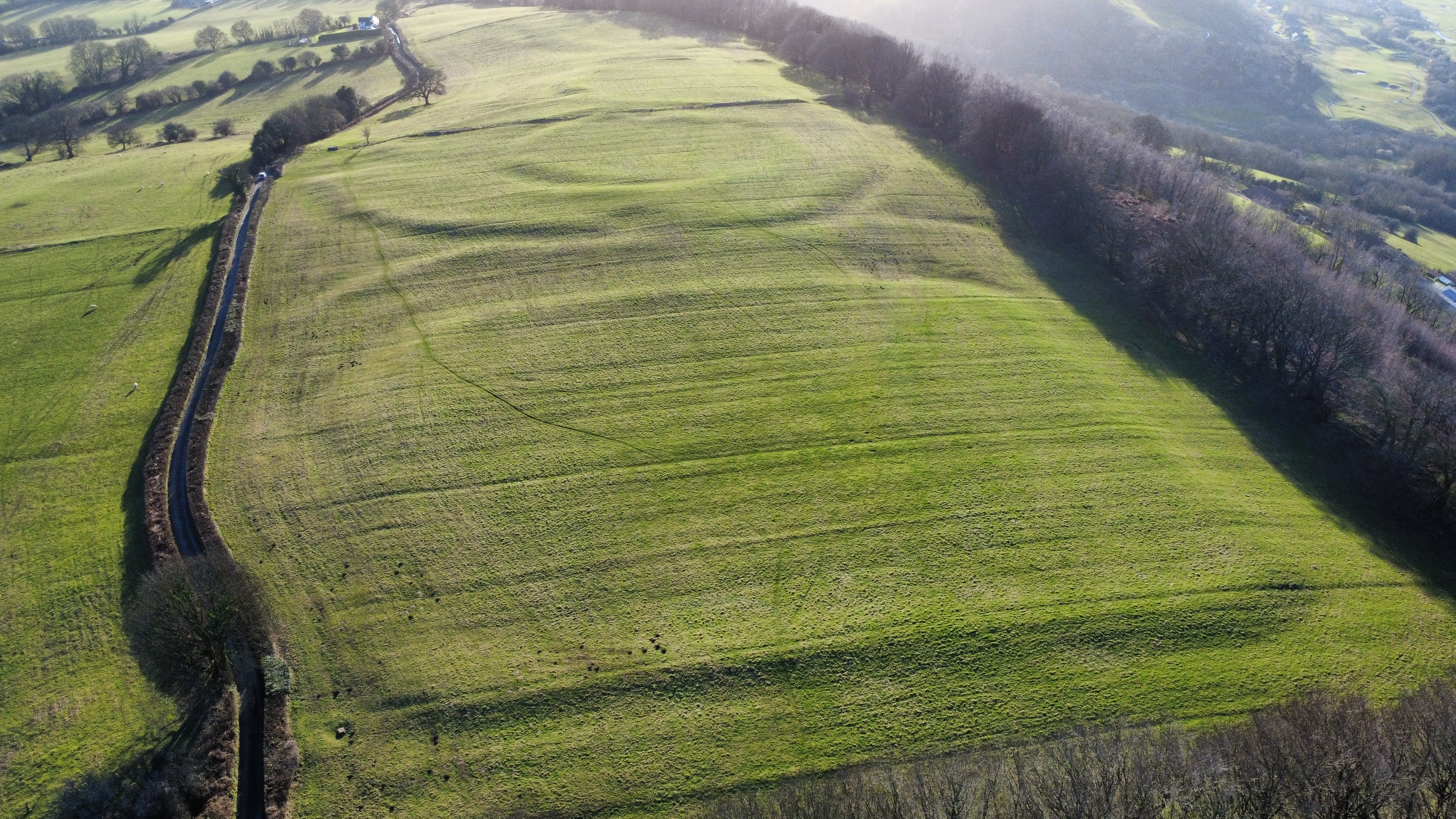
- View of Pen-toppen-ash enclosures, looking west-southwest.
- Interactive map of Pen-toppen-ash
- 51.6198°N 2.8998°W
- Type: Earthwork enclosures
- Periods: Late prehistoric, Iron Age, Roman, mediaeval
- Location: Coed-y-Caerau
- Region: Newport, Wales

History
- Built: Late prehistoric

Site notes
- Material: Earth
- Area: 9.3 hectares (23 acres)
- Condition: Partial restoration
- Owner: Private
- Public access: No
- Scheduled monument no. MM042

Pen-toppen-ash is the site of a series of Welsh earthwork enclosures at Coed-y-Caerau north of Langstone, Newport. Archaeologists consider the structures as dating from late prehistoric times.

== Location ==
The site is on the crest of Kemeys Graig, a sandstone ridge formed in the Devonian period, southeast of the River Usk. Strategically, it affords views of Caerleon, the flood plain of the River Usk and beyond on one side and the land sloping down to Severn Estuary including the Gwent Levels, Newport and the mouth of the River Usk on the other. On some maps, a part of the earthworks is marked as a peak of 192 metres (630 ft), but the bedrock of Kemeys Graig continues to rise to the northeast.

== History ==
The three earthwork enclosures of Pen-toppen-ash are intersecting, with the last usage possibly during the mediaeval period. The southwestern structure is univallate (having a single surrounding bank), up to 2.5 metres (8 ft 2 in) high, an oval with a diameter of approximately 90 metres (300 ft) with elements of an outer part on the southern side and possibly an entrance. The middle structure is bivallate, up to 80 metres (260 ft) in diameter and 1.5 metres (4 ft 11 in) high, perhaps partly spiralling, with the encircling outer bank about 140 metres (460 ft) in diameter and linked to the southwestern structure; the main, central area is 0.45 hectares (1.1 acres).

The third, north-eastern structure is an enclosure which has previously been suggested as a Roman fortlet or more possibly was reused in Roman times as it is considered likely to have far older origins because of similarities with ancient structures elsewhere in Wales, particularly in Glamorgan, with evidence from at least the Iron Age found in a dig at Whitton, South Glamorgan, in 1981 (the remains of a Roman fortlet in Coed-y-Caerau woods lie to the northwest). It is bivallate, made up of two rectangles with curved corners, the inner one approximately 108 by 96 metres (354 by 315 ft), with the long axis northwest–southeast, and the outer concentric rectangle nearly 170 metres (560 ft) square.

An associated structure on the site might be an annexe to this sub-rectangular structure, possibly from an earlier date, which has been built over. A three-stage analysis of a number of sites by the Glamorgan-Gwent Archaeological Trust in a report by Hannah Wiggins for Cadw in 2006 included Pen-toppen-ash in the list of defended enclosures. No archaeological dig has taken place at the site so any evidence of housing structures is unknown.

The area containing Pen-toppen-ash was numbered as fields 185 and 205 on the tithe maps of the 1800s. They were used for pasture and this continues today within the same overall field boundaries. The fields cover an area of 9.3 hectares (23 acres).

The appearance of, and structural relationships between, the enclosures are not readily visible from the ground. The two-inch-to the mile "Newport21" map of 1811 kept at The British Library, labelled Sheet 176, shows Pen-toppen-ash as a fort with a simple concentric ring structure. The cartographer's interpretation on the 25- and 6-inch Ordnance Survey maps from 1882 onwards completely omits the north-eastern enclosure and this drawing was copied through on subsequent OS maps for the next 90 years, not updated until 1971. An aerial view with oblique sunlight shows the wider features and intersections clearly.

== Gallery ==
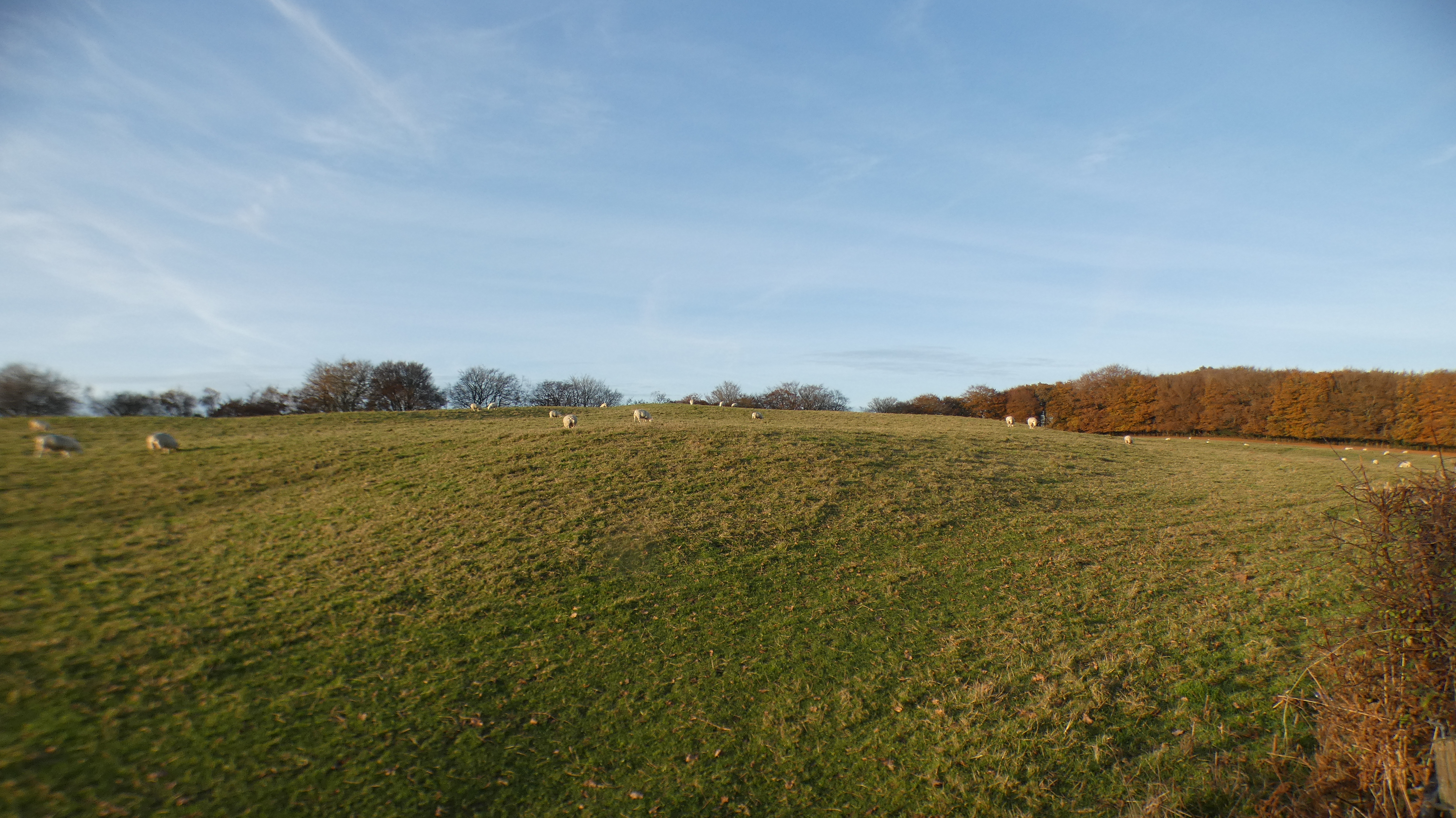
View of the limited ground-level perspective of the central concentric enclosure from Coed-y-Caerau Lane, showing two levels of banking, the higher part within.

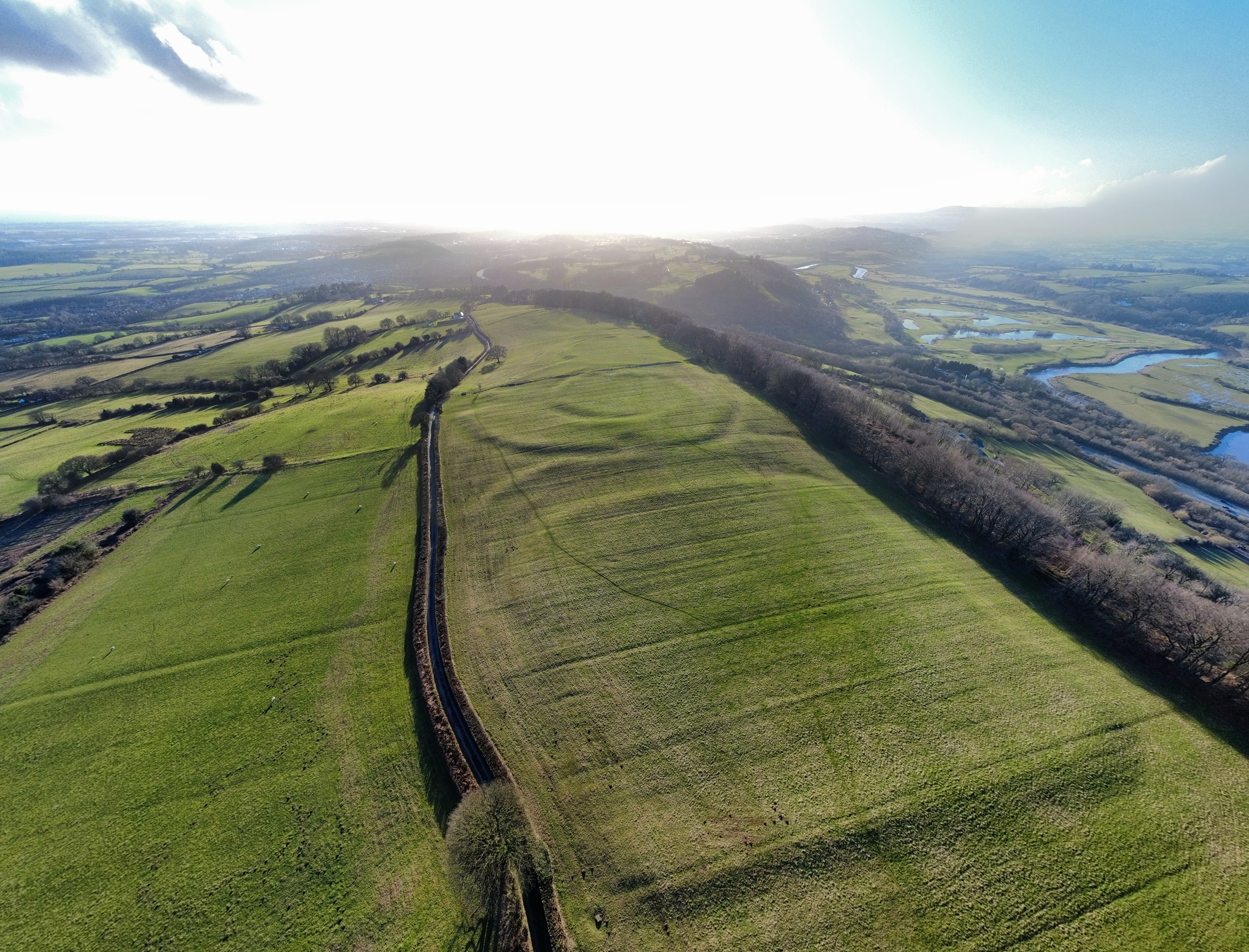
Wide-view format of Pen-toppen-ash on Kemeys Graig, showing the meandering River Usk to the right and Caerleon and Newport in the distance.

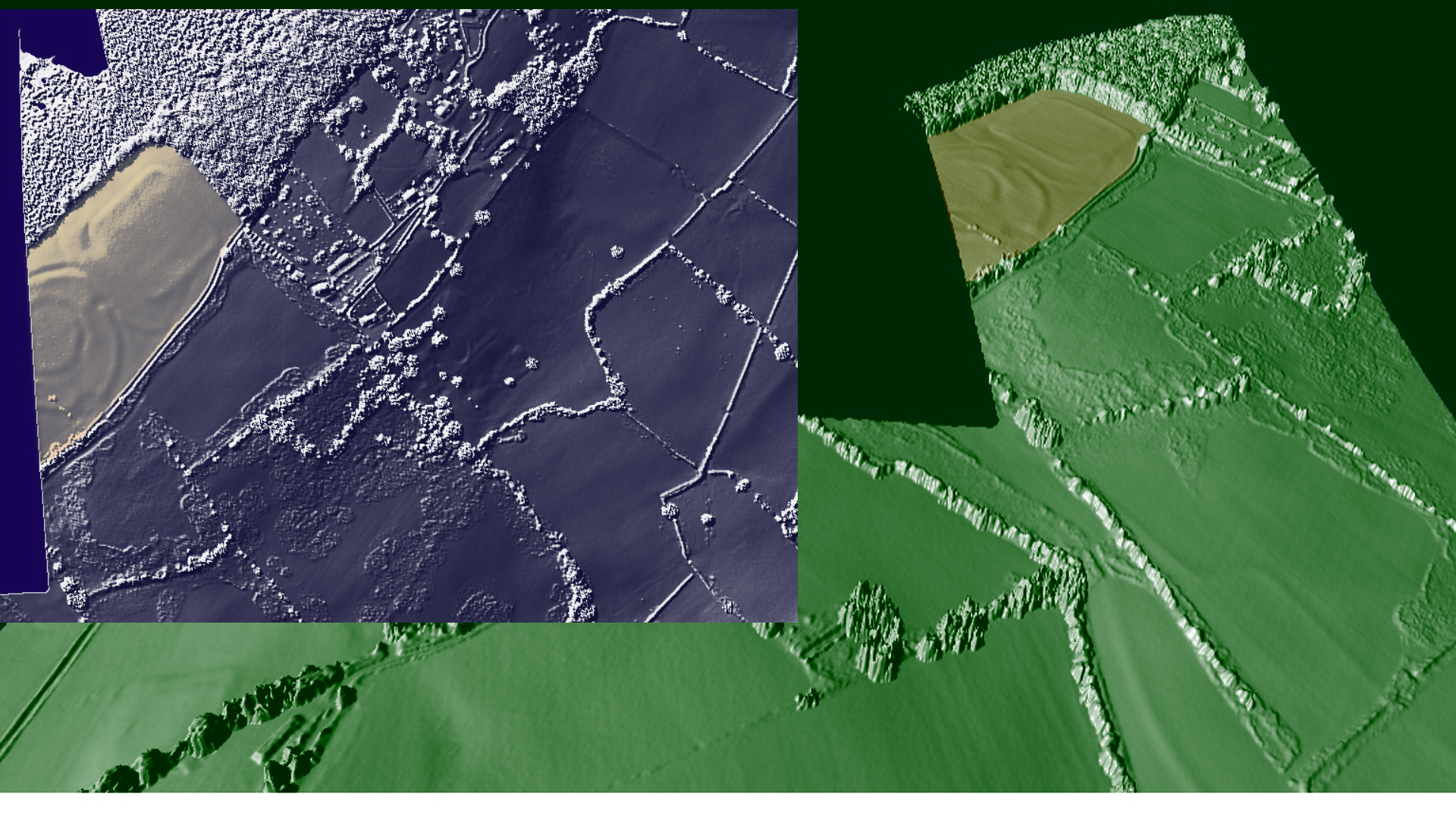
Detail of 1-metre LIDAR image and a 3-D rendering of it highlighting the northeastern half of Pen-toppen-ash on Kemeys Graig
