= Bishton =

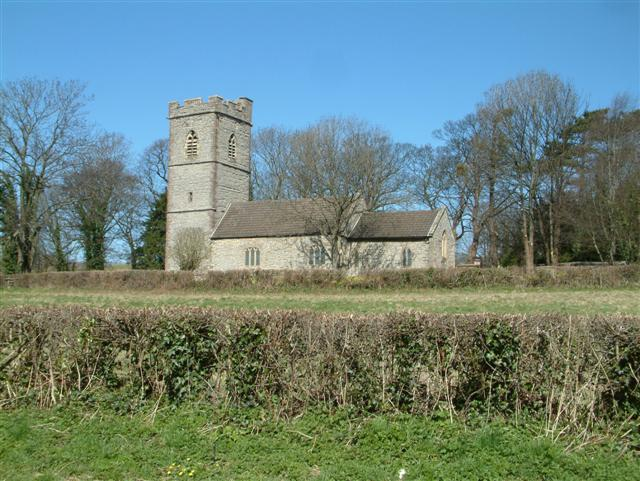
- St Calwaladr's Church

- Location within Newport
- Population: 2,181 (2001 census)
- OS grid reference: ST391876
- Principal area: Newport
- Country: Wales
- Sovereign state: United Kingdom
- Post town: NEWPORT
- Postcode district: NP18
- Dialling code: 01633; Llanwern exchange
- Police: Gwent
- Fire: South Wales
- Ambulance: Welsh
- UK Parliament: Newport East
- Senedd Cymru – Welsh Parliament: Newport East
- List of places UK Wales Newport 51.58395°N 2.88035°W Map of the community

Bishton or Bishopston (Welsh: Llangadwaladr Trefesgob or simply Trefesgob) is a small rural community in the east of the city of Newport, South Wales. It lies in the Llanwern electoral district (ward) and contains the eastern end of Llanwern steelworks, the Underwood estate as well as Bishton itself. The population in the 2001 census was 2,181; dropping to 2,137 in 2011.

== History ==
The earliest record is from the Liber Landavensis (12th century) which states that Guidnerth was pardoned three years after killing his brother Merchion and was granted the land and woods from the coastline of Llangadwaladr to St. Cadwaladr's church in a charter witnessed by Bishop Berthguinus sometime around the year 700. The name is said to derive from "Bishop's Town", as the village has been alleged to be the sometime home of the Bishops of Llandaff. Owain Glyndŵr destroyed the palaces at Bishton and Llandaff, from which time the episcopal palace was moved to Mathern. Bishop John Pascall died here of the plague in 1361.

The remains of Bishton Castle, on raised ground located by a farm to the west of Bishton Road, are a scheduled monument.

=== St Cadwaladr's church ===
The dedication of Bishton church to Cadwaladr is one of only two known instances, the other being in Llangadwaladr in Anglesey, though St Mary's Church, Magor may also have been originally dedicated to him. Cadwaladr was the final Welsh King of Britain, dying in AD 664, according to Geoffrey of Monmouth. The church site has a familiar circular Celtic llan but the building dates from the early English period.

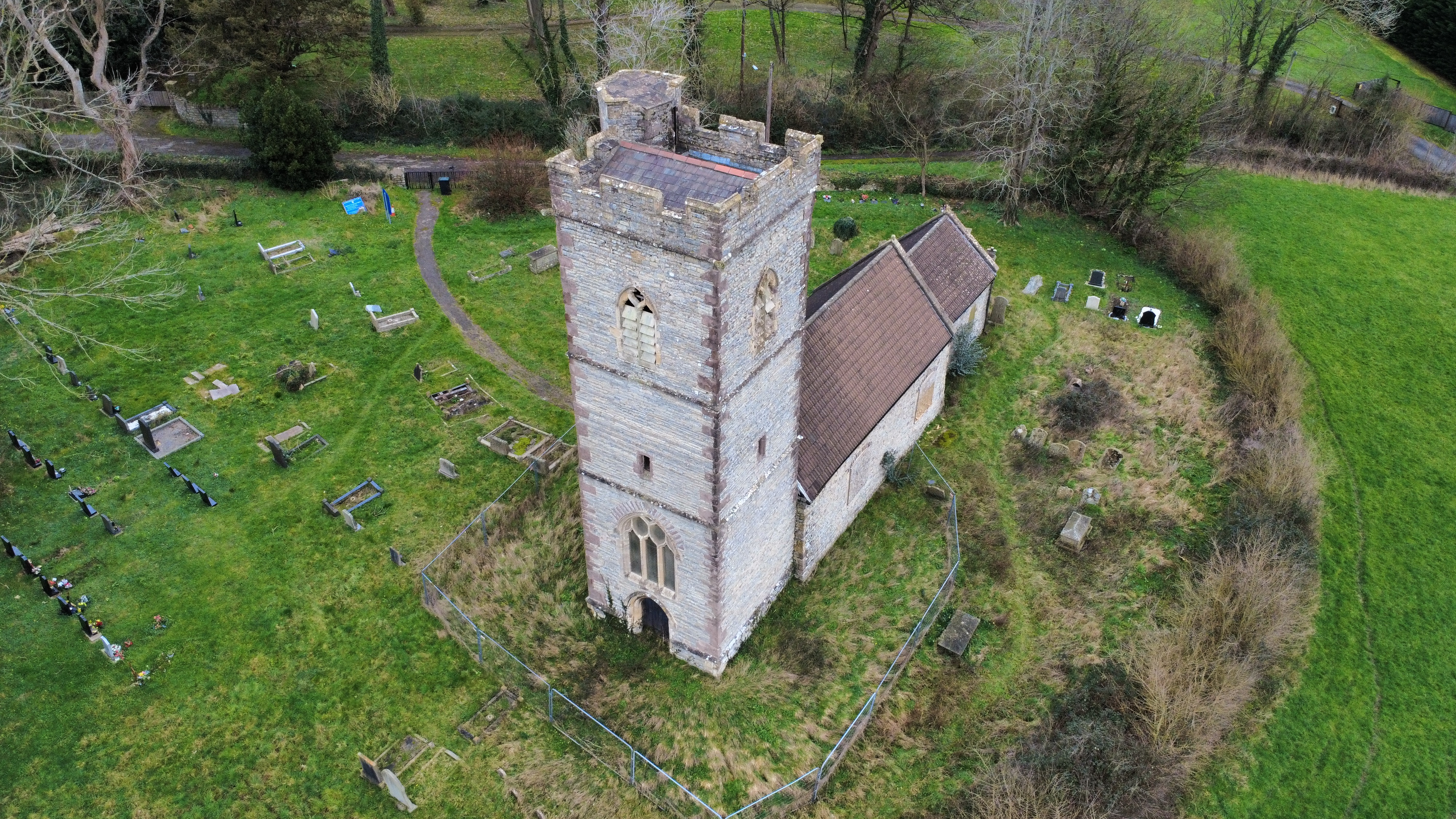
St Calwaladrs Church in 2026, currently not accessible.

The decorated and perpendicular church was badly damaged in 1760 when the tower collapsed. Restoration followed, and in the 19th century the porch was added. Some windows date from the 18th century, but many are later, from the Victorian era. The later tower, with one bell, was completed in 1887 in the Victorian Gothic Style by John Prichard. The origins of the chancel arch are unclear while the font is 14th century and the stoup is 15th century. The east stained glass window is from 1915. The church was designated as a Grade II listed building in 1963.

Welsh remained the language of church services at Bishton until 1828. Sunday Worship is held at 11.00 am, on the 1st and 3rd Sundays. The church is subject to a gateway grant from the National Churches Trust. In 2020 the need for restoration work primarily to the tower, was highlighted. A project will develop repair proposals and will include an ecology survey.

== Government ==
The area is governed by the Newport City Council and the Bishton community council.
