= Fishing basket =

Container used to trap fish

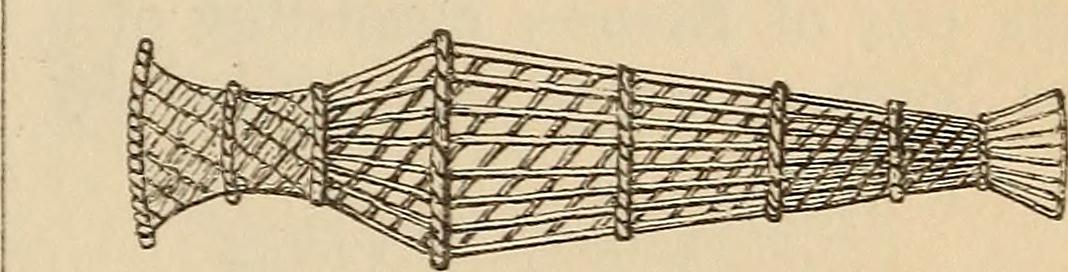
A Roman fishing basket (Latin nassa)

A fishing basket is a basket used as a trap for fishing.

== History ==
The ancient Egyptians used weir baskets made from willow branches to fish the Nile river.

The use of fishing weirs was specifically outlawed throughout England, except at the seacoast, in Magna Carta, but little heed was given to the restrictions.

The Spaniards named the Nazas River locatated in Northern Mexico after the fishing baskets they saw the local peoples using in the river.

== Geography ==
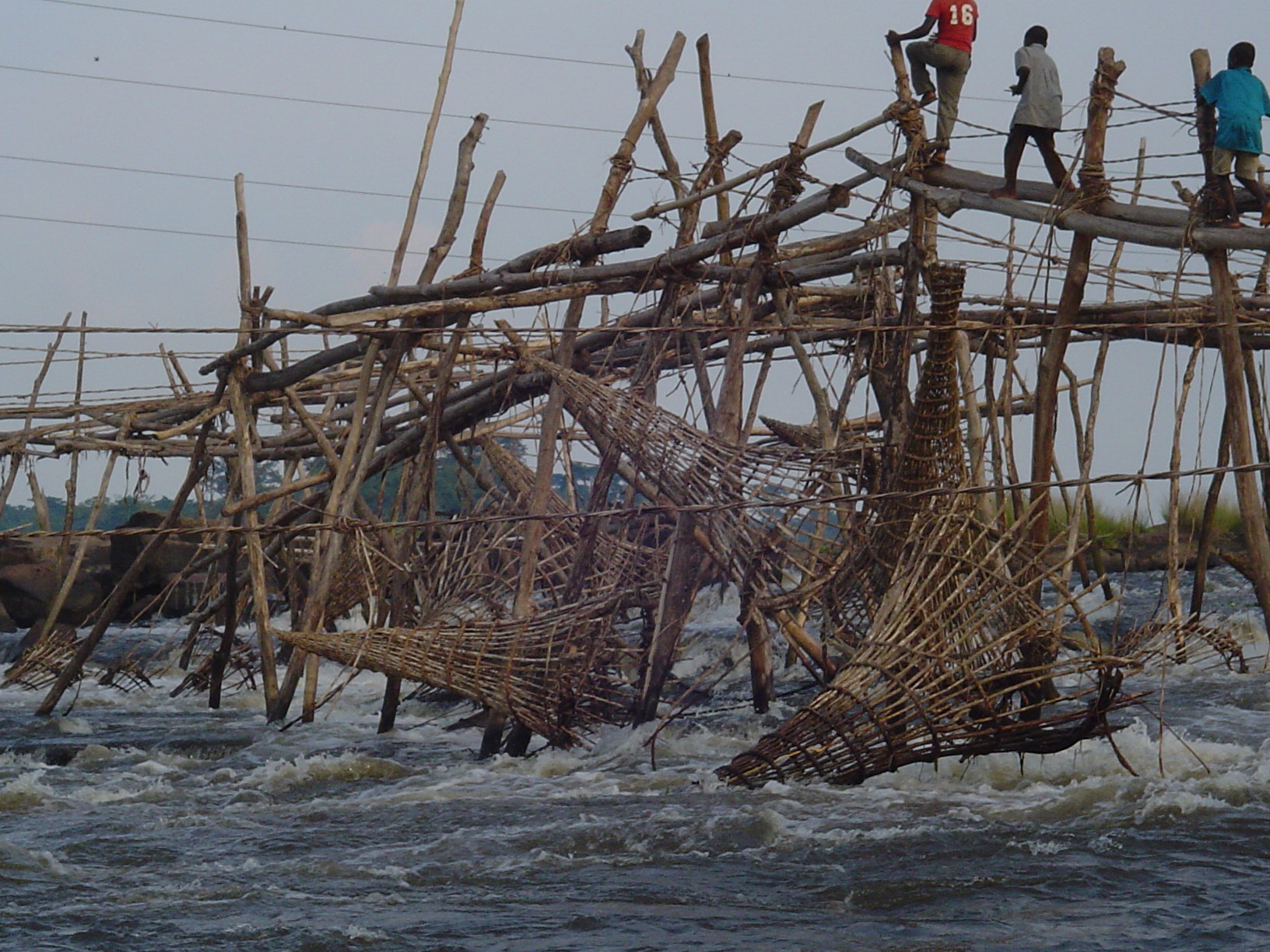
Wagenya fishing baskets in the Congo River rapids

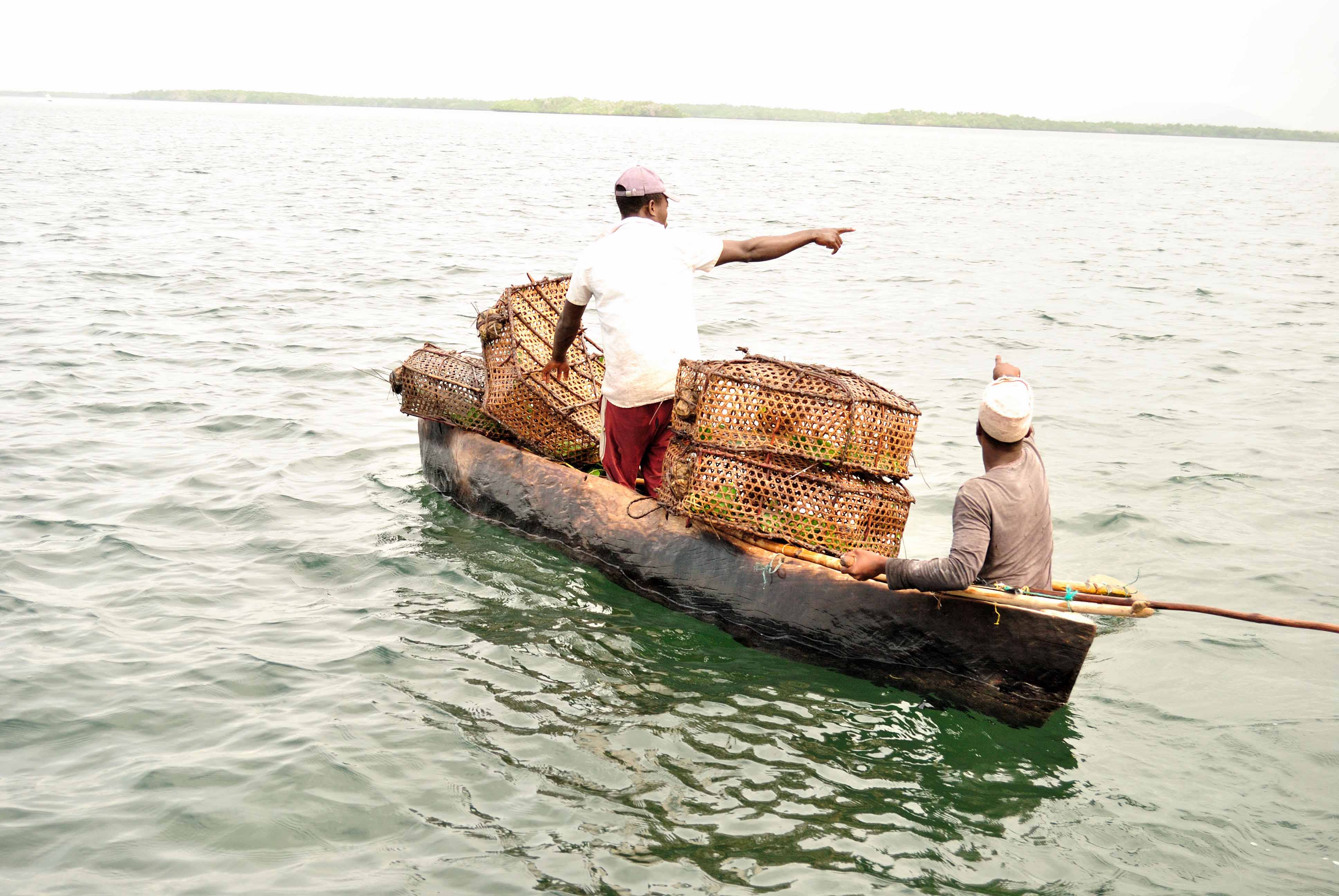
Local fishers in Kenya using the traditional basket trap

Russians and other Slavic peoples have traditionally used fishing traps made of osiers. The proto-Slavic word for this type of fishing basket is reconstructed as vьrša.

The Wagenya of the Democratic Republic of the Congo build a huge system of wooden tripods across the Congo River. These tripods are anchored on the holes naturally carved in the rock by the water current. To these tripods are anchored large baskets, which are lowered in the rapids to “sieve” the waters for fish. It is a very selective fishing method, as these baskets are quite big and only large fish are entrapped.Twice a day the adult Wagenya people pull out these baskets to check if there is any fish caught; in which case somebody will dive into the river to fetch it. At the end of each day the product of this ancient way of fishing is divided among all the members of the same family; including also those who did not take direct action into it. The locations where each individual can set his baskets are inherited.

Elver fishing using basket traps, including eel bucks, has been of significant economic value in many river estuaries on the western seaboard of Europe.

The Kuki people of India, Burma, and Bangladesh use many kinds of traps and snares, including the Bawm (basket trap). Ngoituh is a method of using dams and baskets in a flowing river to catch fish.

The Gogodala women of Papua New Guinea earn income from their making of fishing baskets.

The tribes of Jharkhand in India use a unique local bamboo to fashion sturdy fishing baskets.

== Cultural significance ==
The Dance of Cambodia can involve the carrying of fishing baskets.

The basket stitch on an Aran sweater on the Aran Islands off Ireland signifies the fisherman's basket and the knitter's wish for the recipient's plentiful catch.

== See also ==
- Corf
- Creel
- Fish trap
- History of fishing
- Putcher fishing
