= Whitson =

Village near Newport in South Wales

Coordinates: 51.55°N 2.90°W

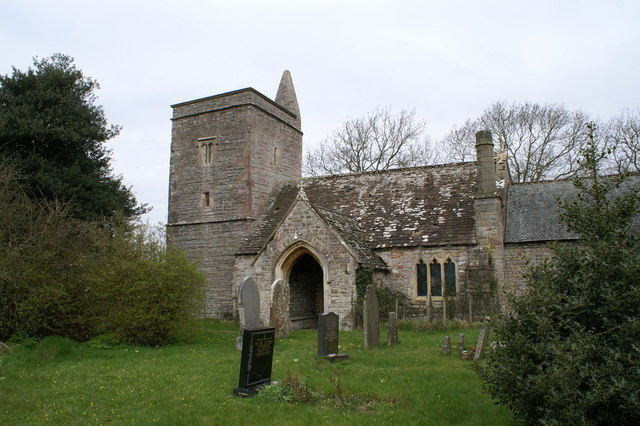
- St. Mary's Church

- Location within Newport
- Population: 339 (2001 census, combined with Goldcliff)
- Principal area: Newport
- Country: Wales
- Sovereign state: United Kingdom
- Post town: NEWPORT
- Postcode district: NP18
- Dialling code: 01633; Maindee exchange
- Police: Gwent
- Fire: South Wales
- Ambulance: Welsh
- UK Parliament: Newport East
- Senedd Cymru – Welsh Parliament: Newport East

Whitson is a village on the outskirts of the city of Newport, South Wales. It is located about 7 miles (11 km) south-east of Newport city centre on the Caldicot Levels, a large area of coastal land reclaimed from the sea. Administratively, Whitson is part of the community of Goldcliff.

== Origin of the name ==
Sir Joseph Bradney, in his History of Monmouthshire (1922), is undecided on the derivation of the name of the manor and surrounding village, but notes early spellings such as Witston, Widson and Wyttston. It seems most likely, however, that the name came from "Whitestone", similar to the adjacent "Goldcliff". In 1358 the manor was held "...by John de Saint Maur of Penhow of Peter de Cusance by knight service, as of his manor of Langstone". In the 18th and 19th centuries the Phillips family owned a large estate in the parish and lived at what was then called "Whitson House" (now "Whitson Court").

== Character ==
Together with the neighbouring larger parishes of Nash and Goldcliff it is one of the so-called "Three Parishes" which have long been treated as a unit – geographically, socially, economically and ecclesiastically.

At high-tide much of the land in the village is below sea-level. A main drainage ditch, with an origin near Llanwern, known as "Monksditch" or "Goldcliff Pill" (Note: "Pîl" is a word found across the Monmouthshire and Glamorganshire coasts, meaning an inlet or haven off the River Severn or Bristol Channel) passes through the village on its way to the sea. Local folklore maintains that the sides of the Monksditch are laced with smuggler's brandy.

The layout of the village and its houses and farmsteads reflects a medieval 'cope' land allocation pattern, similar to that used in land reclamation in Holland. Porton House is situated next to the sea and accessed from Great Porton. Historically, Porton has been part of Goldcliff and may have once had its own separate church, although confusion with Whitson church seems more likely. For many years Porton, like Goldcliff, was the site of a salmon fishery.

== History ==
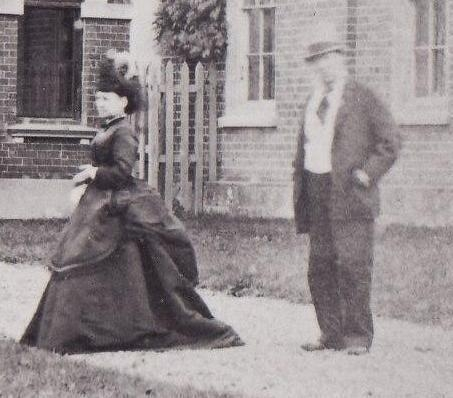
Mr & Mrs John Knox Richards Phillips outside Whitson Court, c.1890

The National Gazetteer of Great Britain and Ireland (1868) describes the village as "a parish in the lower division of Caldicott Hundred, county Monmouth, 6 miles S.E. of Newport" and says, "The land is partly in common. The living is a vicarage in the diocese of Llandaff value £180, in the alternate patronage of the Chapter of Llandaff and the Provost of Eton College. The church is said to have belonged to Portown, a place now swallowed up by the sea." Kelly's Directory of 1901 lists the Parish Clerk as one William Roberts and sub-postmaster as one Richard Keyte. Two private dwellings are listed for a Mr. St. John Knox Richards Phillips J.P. at Whitson Court and for Reverend John Price of St.Bees (vicar of Whitson & Goldcliff) at the Vicarage.

Commercial residents are listed as:

- Henry Gale, farmer, Church Farm;
- John Hale, farmer, Whitson Farm;
- Mrs Charlotte Howells, farmer, Whitson Green;
- Thomas James, Newhouse;
- Edward Jones, stonemason;
- Robert Roberts, farmer;
- John Keyte, farmer, Chestnut Tree Farm;
- Richard Keyte, carpenter, wheelwright & post office;
- Edgar Morgan, farmer, Court Farm;
- John Waters, farmer, Green Court;
- Charles Webb, farmer.

The Rev. Henry Morgan reports the story of Eve, daughter of the Whitson postmaster, who died at The Farmer's Arms in Goldcliff. Said to have haunted the area, Eve's ghost was chased by the villagers whereupon she flung herself into a well. The well became known as "Ffynnon Eva" or Eve's Well – in the Newport district in Beechwood now known as Eveswell.

== Architecture ==
=== Church of St Mary ===
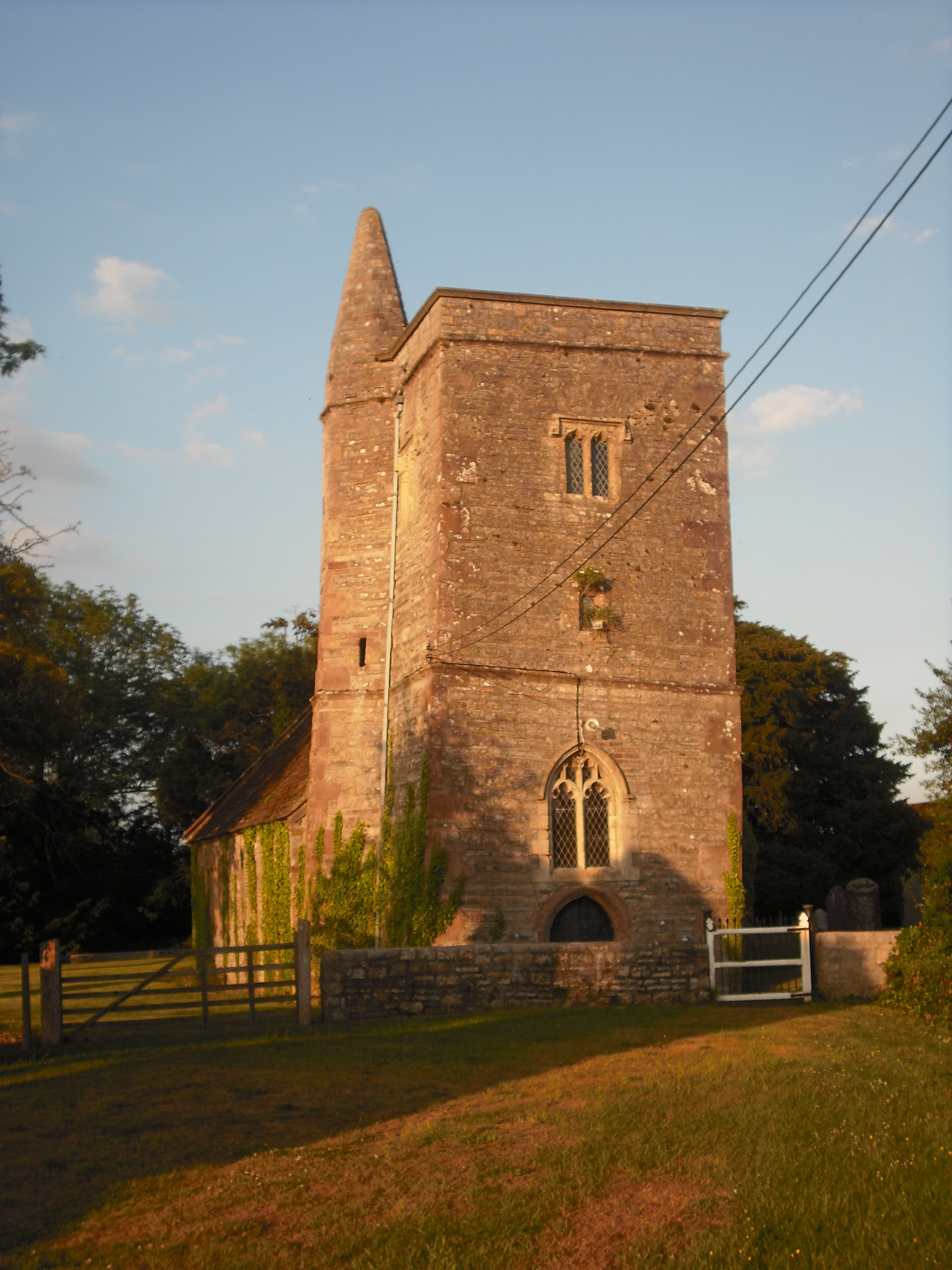
St. Mary's Church in 2009

The parish church with its distinctive "thimble tower" is situated in the east of the village at Porton. It is a Grade II* listed building and is thought to have originally been a chapellage of the Benedictine Priory at Goldcliff. Although the original dedication is unclear, the church is known locally as St. Mary's (not to be confused with the Church of St Mary Magdalene, Goldcliff). The church is built of stone, in the Early English style, with a chancel, nave, south porch and a tower, originally containing two bells. The inscription for the larger bell was "God save our King and Kingdom, and send us peace. W. and E. 1758" and for the smaller bell of the same date "Obedite".

Prior to the 20th century the nave was restored and the chancel rebuilt. There is a Norman font and a stained-glass memorial east window erected in 1884 by the family of Reverend John Beynon. The register of baptisms dates from 1744, marriages from 1729 and burials from 1728. In 1901 the living was a vicarage with a net income of £196, including 49 acres (20 ha) of glebe and residence, in the gift of Eton College and the Dean and Chapter of Llandaff alternately, and held from 1900 by the Reverend John Price.

Bradney (1933) notes the church as "remarkable for its fine tower with a pinnacle at one corner." The church closed, as it was in a very poor state of repair, and was placed on the council's register for Buildings at Risk. The churchyard, which is well maintained, may still be accessed by means of a public footpath through private land. In November 2018 it was stated that plans to convert the church to a private residence were likely to be rejected because of flood risk. Concerns were also raised over a stained glass window, dedicated to the memory of Herbert and Alice Stevens, paid for by their 14 children. In 2021 planning permission to convert the church into residential accommodation was granted by Newport City Council and the church was sold at auction in February 2022.

=== Whitson Court ===
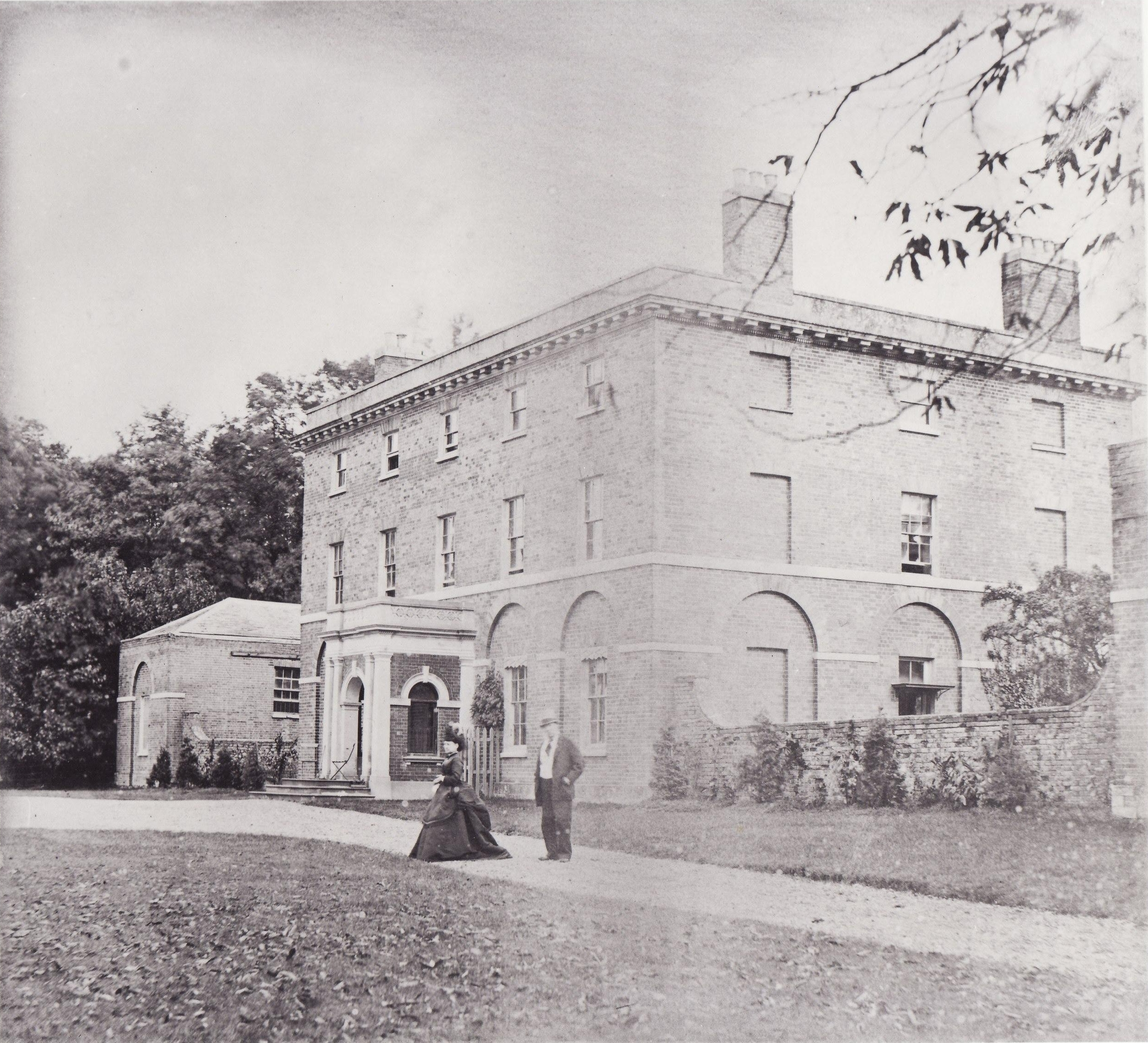
Whitson Court, c.1890

Whitson Court is a neo-classical house. Built in the grounds of a medieval tithe barn linked to Goldcliff Priory and on the site of an earlier house, the present property was built for William Phillips (1752–1836), High Sheriff for Monmouthshire, in about 1791 and is a Grade II* listed building, retaining many original features. Originally believed to have been designed by Anthony Keck, who had designed a similar property at Iscoed in Carmarthenshire, Whitson House had many Nash-inspired additions including the unsupported cantilever stone spiral staircase in the hall, similar to that of Ffynone House at Manordeifi in Pembrokeshire, with an arched door frame underneath and plasterwork known to have been used at other Nash houses. There were also false plaster windows added to the ends of the adjoining pavilions which were typical of John Nash. In the same year (1791), Nash was working on his design for Newport Bridge and the lodge at Whitson Court is of a typical Nash design.

Monumental inscriptions at Whitson Church indicate that the house was called Whitson House from at least 1789 and for most of the 19th century, but had become Whitson Court by 1903. Memorial stones for the Phillips family may also be found in St. Mary's church in the neighbouring village of Nash. (William Phillips also built Redbrick House in nearby Redwick). After the death of St. John Knox Rickards Phillips, in 1901 ownership of the house passed to a distant relative, Fr Oliver Rodie Vassall-Phillips CSsR. In consequence of the persecution of religious congregations in France, the Sacramentines of Bernay of the Perpetual Adorers of the Blessed Sacrament at the time of the expulsion in July 1903, were compelled to close their boarding-school and go into exile. Thirteen of the sisters retired to Belgium, and founded a house at Hal, while the rest of their community settled at Whitson Court – thanks to the generosity of Reverend Vassall-Phillips, who wrote:

"This order of nuns existence is precarious, for they are not permitted to open a school. Their days are spent in prayer, adoration, and the making of altar-breads, vestments, and church ornaments." In 1910 the left pavilion wing, which was used as the estate laundry, was partially destroyed by fire.

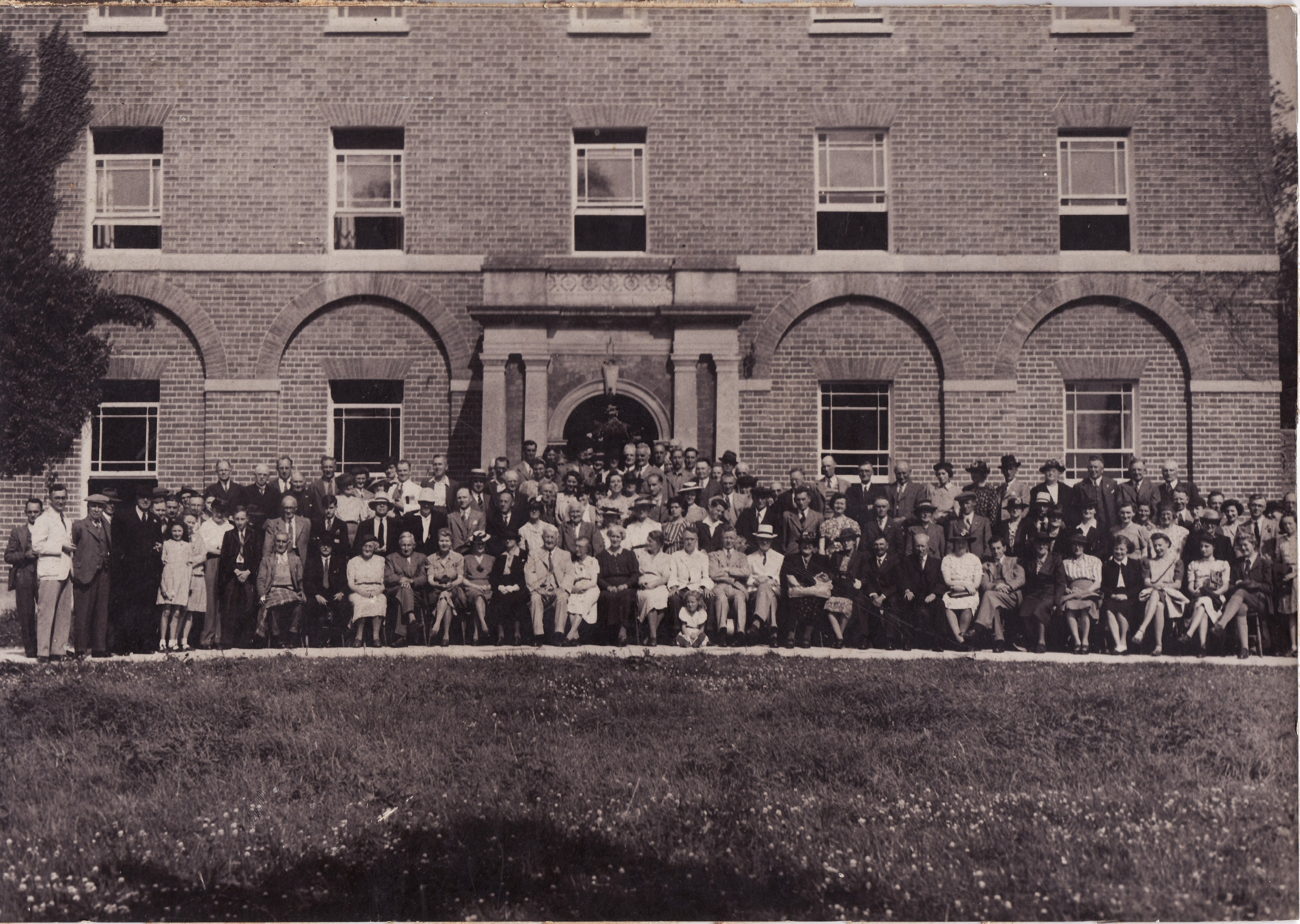
A meeting of the Monmouthshire Bee Keepers Association, Whitson Court, c.1941

In March 1911, the Sacramentines were permitted by Archbishop Farley to open a house in Holy Trinity parish, Yonkers, New York and the house and estate at Whitson were then used as a training school for their African missions. In 1917, the Whitson Estate, encompassing most of the local farms and totalling some 1,050 acres (420 ha) and the Manorial Title, were sold at auction mainly to its existing tenant farmers. When Bradney published his "History of Monmouthshire" in 1932, the house stood empty. In 1933 Whitson Court and its remaining 18 acres (7.3 ha) of gardens and parkland, were purchased from the then owner, Squire Oakley, by Mr Garroway Smith of Newport. During World War II, the family gave sanctuary to several German Jewish refugees as well as providing work for German Prisoners of War – many of the paths in the grounds were built by German POW Officers housed at the Prisoner of War camp in Nash.

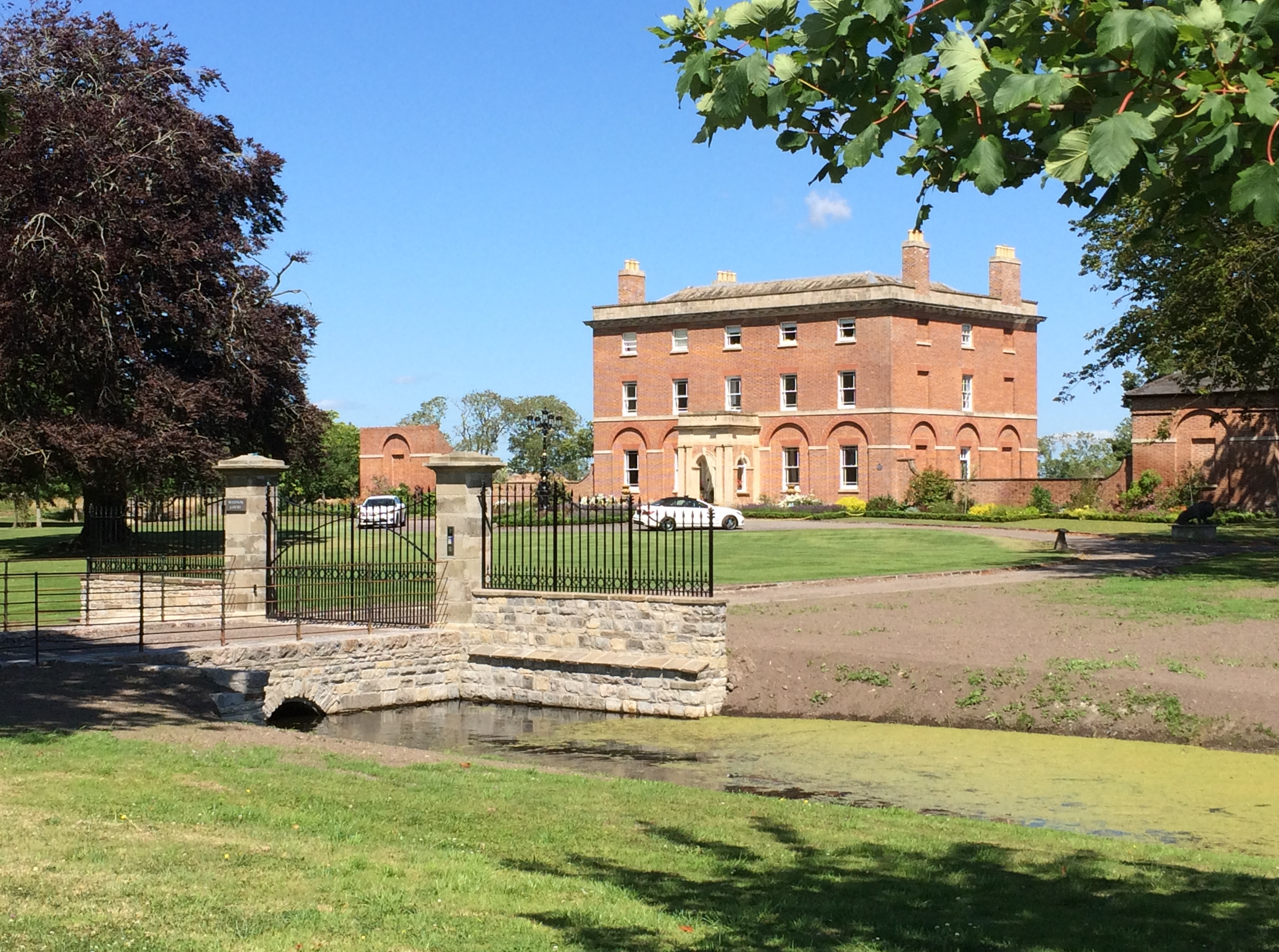
Whitson Court in July 2015

Following the death of Garroway Smith in the late 1950s, the house and grounds passed to his niece, Olive Maybury who made various alterations to the house, adding three neo-classical plaster relief panels to the fire surround in the morning room, an ornately carved fire surround in the former kitchen and the replacement of the dilapidated spiral staircase to the top floor of the house, with a Gothic secondary staircase, removed from Plas LLecha at Tredunnock. The family collected exotic animals including Bornean Sun Bears, Himalayan Bears, lions and a large collection of monkeys, reptiles and exotic birds. The family opened the grounds to the public during the 1960s and 1970s and they were a popular attraction for local families and school children.

In 1980 Whitson Zoo was closed and the animals re-homed. Olive Maybury continued to live at Whitson Court until her death in 1998 at the age of 99. The house and grounds were subsequently sold by the family and were again left empty, being placed on Newport Council's "Buildings at Risk" register in 2009. The court was subsequently sold and has now been restored, with advice from Cadw.

=== Whitehall Farm/Redbrick House ===
This property is situated in the neighbouring parish of Redwick. The earliest church records show that there has been a house on the site since 1450, then called Whitehall Farm. The main Georgian façade was built in about 1795, by William Phillips, owner of Whiston Court. Phillips built the house in anticipation of his son's return to Britain from the American Colonies, but the son drowned in a shipwreck.

== Amenities ==
The village hall, now unused, was for many years the site of an annual village fair at Whitsuntide. The village was the home for the Post Office for the three parishes for many years but this has now closed. The village has never been known to have had its own public house. There is a large electricity sub-station, operated by the National Grid, adjacent to the former site of Llanwern steelworks near Whitson Arch. The local newspaper is the South Wales Argus which is published in Newport. Since March 2015 the village has used a Demand Responsive Transport public bus service (Route 63, two a day, weekdays) provided by Newport Bus.

=== Upfield Farm Aerodrome ===
In 1995 a light aircraft landing strip (council approved for use as a grass strip for the owner, family and friends) had been developed by the owner. By 2008 the strip had become a 650 metres (2,130 ft)-long concrete airstrip with a series of aircraft hangars. An inquiry by Newport City Council and the Civil Aviation Authority, held after a plane crashed at the farm in 2008, found that the airstrip at the farm had grown considerably beyond the scope of its original approved planning permission, and was, according to some local residents, supporting as many as ten flights a day. The owner applied for retrospective planning permission to retain the facility with its concrete runway, but this was refused by the council. An appeal was dismissed in 2009.

== Government ==
The area is governed by the Newport City Council and the Goldcliff community council. The village falls within the Llanwern ward of the Newport East parliamentary constituency.

== See also ==
- Putcher fishing
