= Goldcliff =

Village near Newport, South Wales

Goldcliff: Welsh: Allteuryn
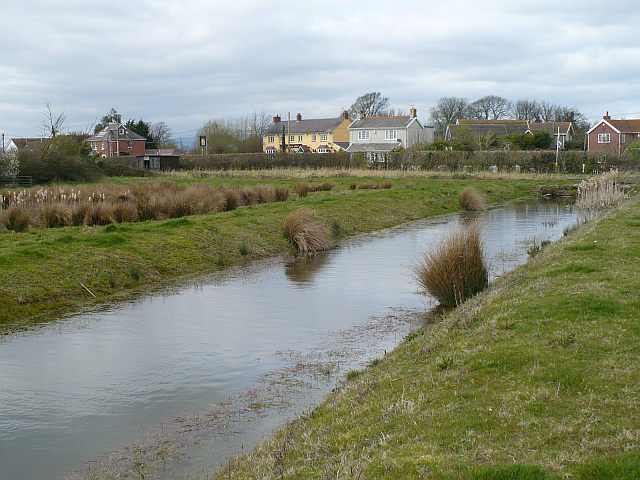
- A reen in Goldcliff with The Farmer's Arms beyond

- Location within Newport
- Population: 329 (2011 census)
- Principal area: Newport
- Preserved county: Gwent
- Country: Wales
- Sovereign state: United Kingdom
- Post town: NEWPORT
- Postcode district: NP18
- Dialling code: 01633; Maindee exchange
- Police: Gwent
- Fire: South Wales
- Ambulance: Welsh
- UK Parliament: Newport East
- Senedd Cymru – Welsh Parliament: Newport East
- List of places UK Wales Newport 51.5431°N 2.9146°W Map of the community

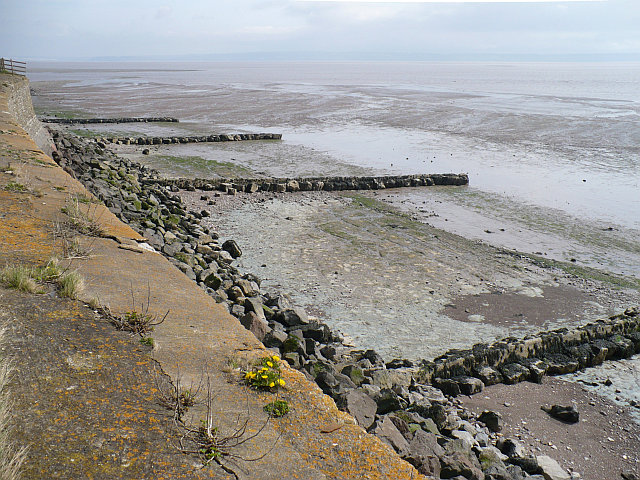
Groynes at Goldcliff Point, 2008

Goldcliff (Welsh: Allteuryn) is a village, parish and community to the south east of the city of Newport in South Wales. It lies within the Newport city boundaries in the historic county of Monmouthshire and the preserved county of Gwent. Administratively, the community of Goldcliff includes the village/parish of Whitson. The population in 2001 was 233; by 2011 it had risen to 329.

== Toponymy ==
The name is said to have originated from the siliceous limestone cliff, standing about 60 feet (18 m) high, at Hill Farm, rising over a great bed of yellow mica which breaks the level at the shore and has a glittering appearance in sunshine, especially to ships passing in the Bristol Channel. Giraldus Cambrensis, who toured Wales in 1188, refers to the location as "Gouldclyffe" and describes it in Latin as "...glittering with a wonderful brightness".

== Character ==
Together with the neighbouring parishes of Nash and Whitson, it is one of "The Three Parishes" which have long been a unit – geographical, socially, economically and ecclesiastically. All three parishes are typical of the Caldicot Levels. At the highest tides the village lies below sea-level. The entire area is drained by a vast network of inter-linking ditches or 'reens'. A main drainage ditch, with an origin near Llanwern, known as "Monksditch" or "Goldcliff Pill", passes through the village on its way to the sea. Local folklore maintains that the sides of the Monksditch are laced with smugglers' brandy.

Fields are drained by low depressions running the width of the fields, known locally as grips. The field area between grips is termed a span or Spain. The grips drain into the reens which are slow-moving and in summer months are often stagnant. Reens run towards the sea where they empty between tides at a gout. The levels of the reens are controlled by means of a series of sluices or stanks, separate boards which may be raised or lowered to keep water levels high enough for livestock to drink. The faster flowing Monksditch carries water from more distant higher ground, above the level of the reens, some of which pass underneath the ditch by means of culverts.

The south of the village is bounded by the foreshore of the Severn Estuary, which lies behind a tall concrete-faced sea wall, allowing for aboiteau-type cultivation. At low tide a number of groynes can be seen, as well as the remains of ancient wooden salmon traps, known locally as putchers.

== History ==
=== Prehistoric, Roman, and Medieval ===
A considerable amount of archaeology has centred on Goldcliff, and the intertidal region of the coast near the village has attracted archaeological interest. Goldcliff has notable evidence of occupation by the Silures.

Hidden in the laminated silts of the Severn estuary foreshore are 8,000-year-old (Mesolithic) human footprints. A report, published jointly by CBA and Cadw, was produced by Martin Bell and colleagues. Bell was instrumental in the discovery of the Mesolithic footprints and in 2004 his work at Goldcliff featured on Channel 4's archaeological television programme Time Team. Further archaeological excavation has also been carried out by Martin Locock and colleagues prior to the introduction of the Newport Wetlands reserve, for example at Hill Farm. In March 2020 Bell was featured, explaining the foreshore footprints, on the BBC One programme Countryfile. In January 2024, episode 3 in series 11 of BBC's archaeology series Digging for Britain featured Bell's discovery and excavation of a mesolithic V-shaped tidal fish trap.

Following gales and high tides in 1990, a total of eight substantial rectangular Iron Age buildings were discovered, over the course of several seasons' work, off the coast near the village. Radiocarbon dating dated the site to the second century BC. The buildings, which may have functioned as a short-lived and specialised fishing site, were constructed from vertical posts bearing the marks of iron axes. Timbers from the excavation, which was performed by St David's University College, Lampeter, have been conserved at Newport Museum.

A connection with Roman activity was firmly established with the discovery near Goldcliff Point in 1878 of the inscribed "Goldcliff Stone" recording the work of legionaries on a linear earthwork, presumably a sea wall. Further evidence of occupation was found when ash pits were dug at Nash during construction of the Uskmouth Power Station.

    1606
ON THE XX DAY OF IANVARY EVEN AS IT CAME TO
PAS IT PLEASED GOD THE FLVD DID FLOW TO THE
EDGE OF THIS SAME BRAS • AND IN THIS PARISH
THEARE WAS LOST 5000 AND ODD POWNDS BESIDES
XXII PEOPLE WAS IN THIS PARRISH DROWND
GOLDCLIF  {JOHN WILKINS OF PILREW AND
           WILLIAM TAP CHURCHWARDENS
    1609

— from the 1609 plaque in St Mary's Church

Goldcliff was originally owned by the native princes of Wales, but was taken from Owain ap Caradog (also known as Owain Wan) son of the last king of Gwent, Caradog ap Gruffydd, by the Norman nobleman Robert de Chandos who, shortly before 1113, founded a priory there.

The higher coastal parts of the area were certainly reclaimed by the late-11th and early-12th century when Goldcliff and Nash were granted to the Benedictine priory. Lower-lying areas inland were enclosed and drained by the 13th and 14th century.

Goldcliff, as "Goldcliffe", and nearby Nash are two of the few villages to appear on the Cambriae Typus map of 1573.

=== Goldcliff Priory ===
On the site of Hill Farm, situated on a prominent knoll of high ground, south of the village and next to the sea, stood Goldcliff Priory. Founded in 1113 as a subject house of the Abbey of Bec in Normandy, it passed during the fifteenth century into the control of Tewkesbury Abbey and then of Eton College.

=== Other historic sites ===
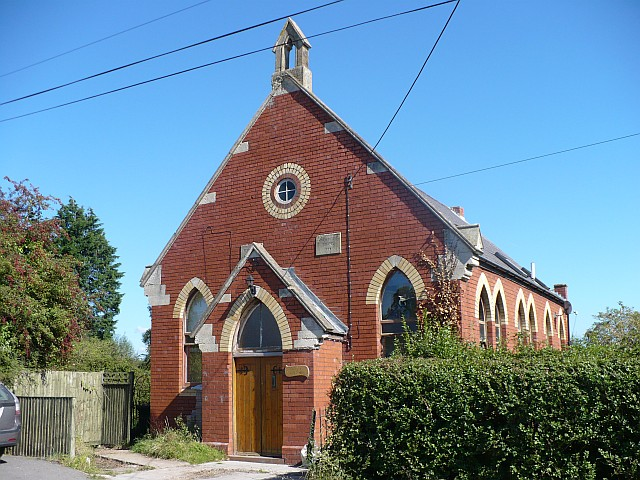
Former Congregational Chapel

A small enclosure on Chapel Lane to the north of the present parish church, is thought to hold the remains of an ancient chapel, probably connected with the Priory. Also located off Chapel Lane, the farmhouse and barn at Great Newra Farm are Grade II listed buildings.

The Congregational (later United Reformed Church) chapel near the junction of the Sea Wall Road, built in 1840 and restored in 1900–01, is now a private dwelling, but was still active as late as the 1980s.

To the south of the village, on the tidal mudflats beyond the seawall at Goldcliff Pill, are the remains of anti-tank defences constructed in the early part of the war in anticipation of a German invasion from Ireland. The defence formed part of Western Command Coastal Crust, and consisted of two areas of concrete blocks designed to impede the movement of tanks. The defences are a scheduled monument.

=== Local industry and education ===
Goldcliff has long been associated with the tidal putcher fishing of salmon, which may well have had its origins with the Priory or even in Roman times. The technique used the so-called "putcher" basket traditionally made from hazel rods and withy (willow) plait, set out against the tides in huge wooden "ranks". The last main exponent of the art of wooden putcher-making at Goldcliff was George Whittaker, although a working knowledge of the technique was also kept into the 1970s by Wyndham Howells of Saltmarsh Farm, the last full-time fisherman at Goldcliff. Deeds for Saltmarsh Farm for 1867–1918 are held by Gwent Record Office. The fishery at Goldcliff was one of the last to cease operation in 1995.

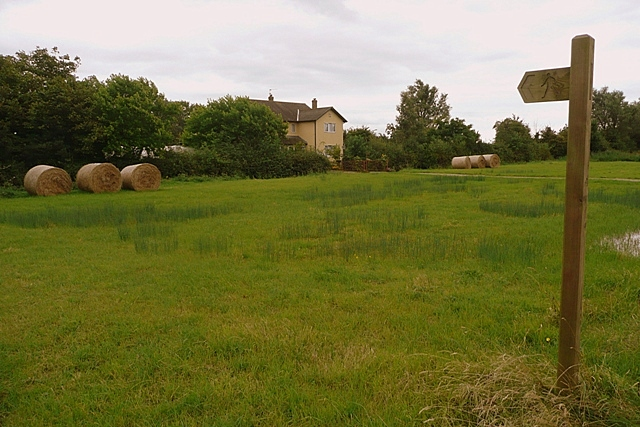
Clifton Common, Goldcliff

The mixed school for the parishes of Goldcliff and Whitson was erected in 1872 for 60 children and in 1901 had an average attendance of 46, with a Miss Mary Edith Tomlinson as the mistress. Until it closed in July 1954, the school received an annual gift of £2 from Eton College.

Kelly's 1901 Directory lists the only private residence in the village as The Moorlands, but has no fewer than 27 commercial concerns, mostly farmers, but also including a haulier, two fishermen, a female publican, a farm bailiff, a hay dealer, a mason and a shoemaker. The Directory also lists a Mrs Annie Louise Taylor as hotelier at "The Temperance Hotel". The hotel, situated at the end of the Sea Wall Road, was a well-known landmark as late as the 1950s. The Moorlands, a Victorian house built in 1870 for the Waters family, had a garden which included acacia, American oak, and Christmas strawberry.

== The church ==
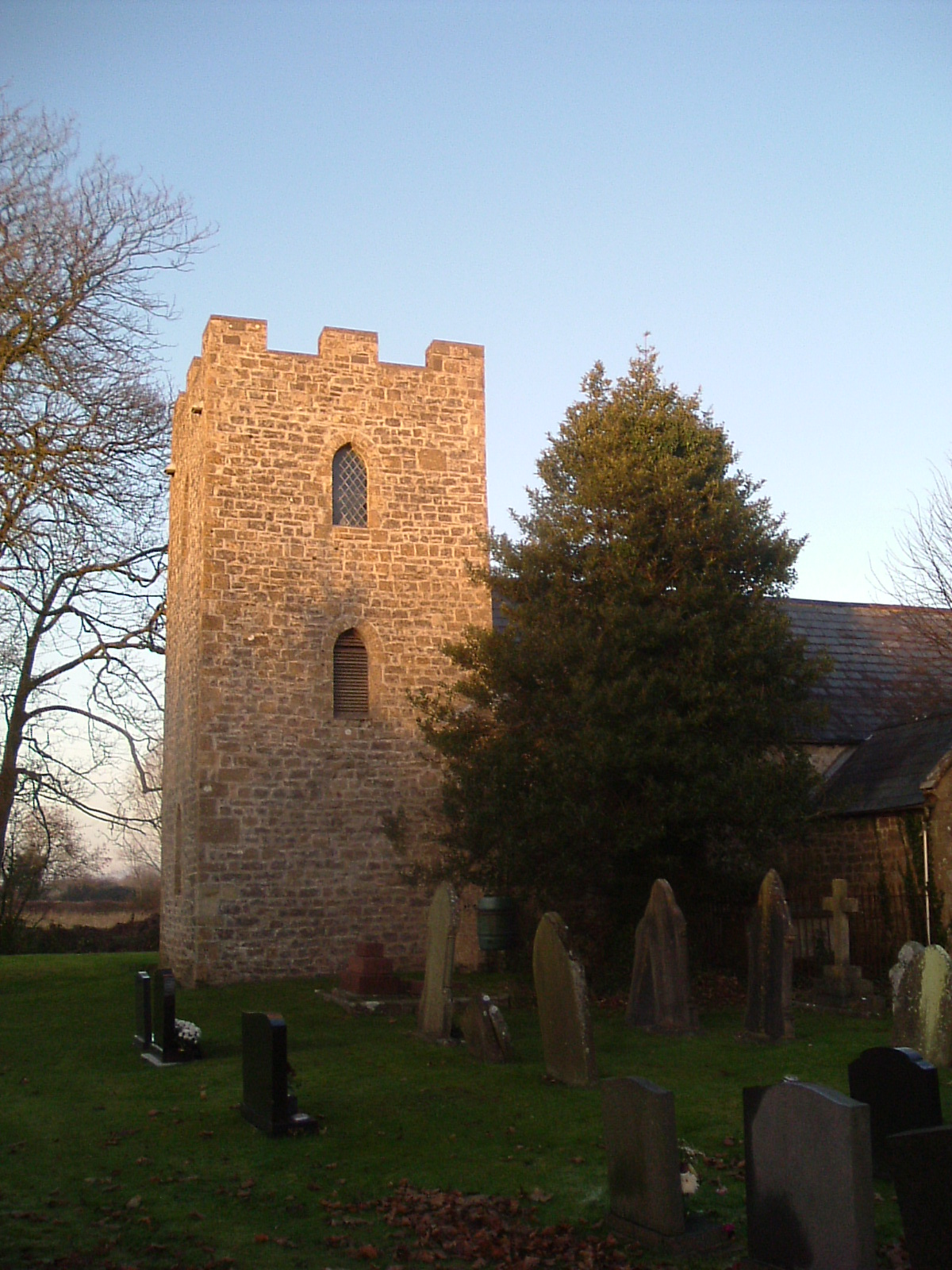
The church of Saint Mary Magdalene, Goldcliff

The parish church of Saint Mary Magdalene is approached through a canopy of pollarded lime trees. The stone building is constructed in the Early English style. The churchyard has the remains of an ancient moulded cross. The first vicar was Roger de Holbrook in 1349 and church records exist from 1724 onwards.

The church has a nave, chancel, a castellated tower and a porch. It dates mostly from the early 15th century but parts of the building appear to be older and the nave has been dated to the 12th century. This may indicate reuse of an earlier building, possibly associated with the original church at Goldcliff Priory, which was damaged by a storm in 1424. The tower is probably an 18th- or 19th-century addition. It contains one bell, recast by Taylors of Loughborough in 1969.

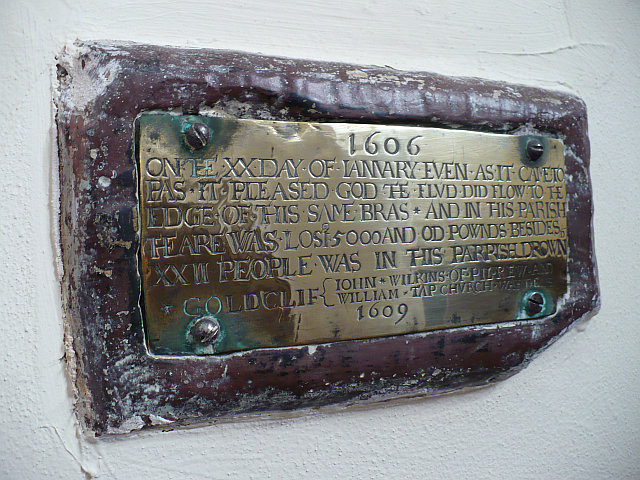
1609 Flood plaque, in St Mary's Church. The plaque records the year as 1606 because, under the Julian calendar in use at that time, the new year did not start until Lady Day, 25 March.

On the north wall of the church, near the altar, a small brass plaque commemorates the Great Flood of 1607 when a storm surge is thought to have swept along the Bristol Channel drowning 2,000 people. The plate, about three feet above ground level today at this point, marks the height of the flood waters. The estimate of financial loss is given as approximately £5,000 (£930,000 in 2016). There is a medieval font with an 18th-century cover. Following interior re-decoration in 2006, including the removal of the old pews and pulpit, a service of re-dedication was held on 4 February 2007 with the Bishop of Monmouth.

The former vicarage for the three parishes, located in Whitson, is now a private home. The minister for the Rectoral Benefice of Magor, which includes Magor, Nash, Undy, Llanwern, Wilcrick, Bishton, Llanmartin, Langstone, and Redwick, is based in Magor.

== Amenities ==
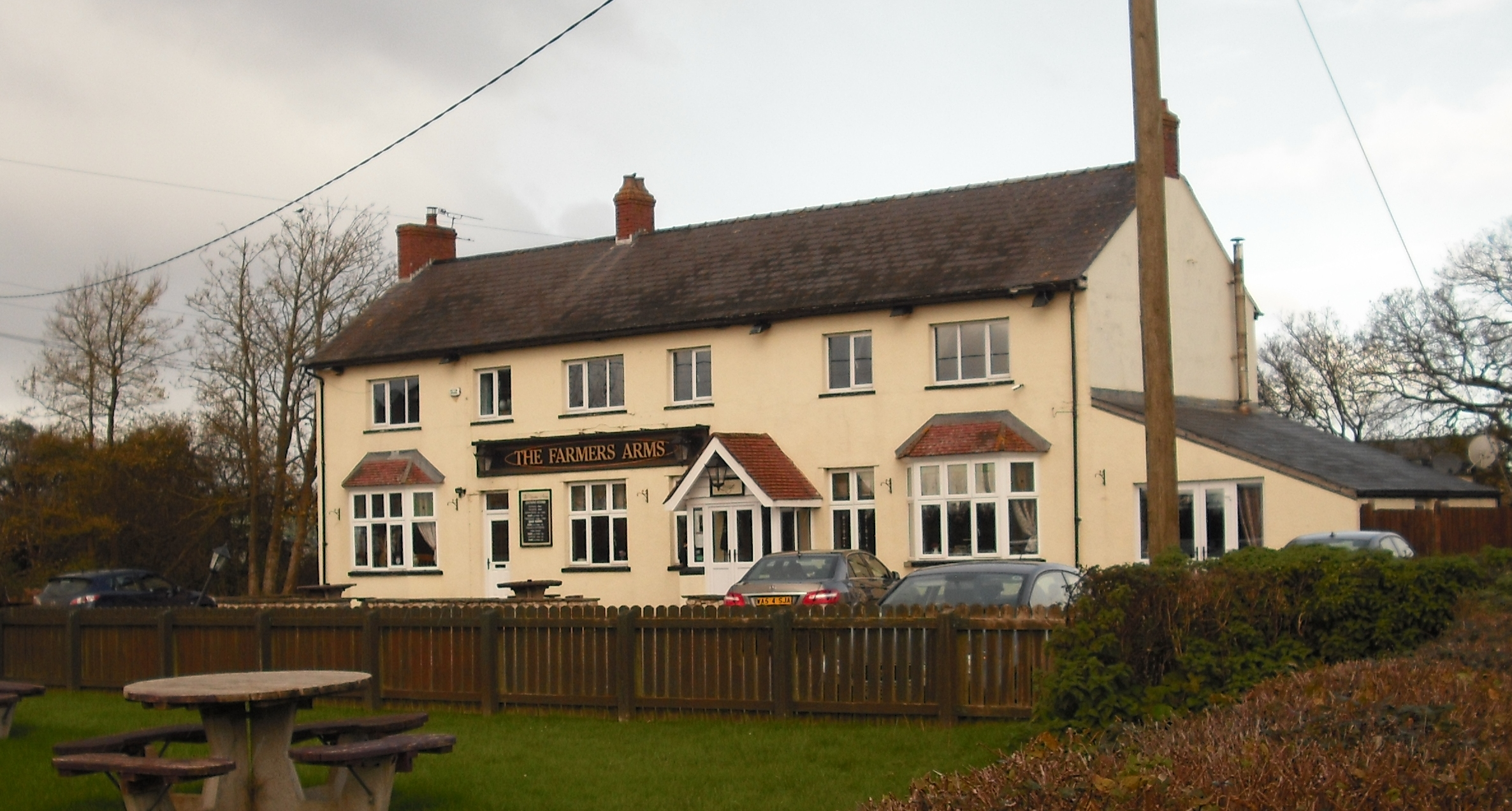
The Farmer's Arms, 2017

Goldcliff is home to part of the extensive Newport Wetlands, opened in March 2000 as a mitigation for the loss of mudflats caused by the building of the Cardiff Bay Barrage. Parts of Goldcliff and Whitson together are designated a Site of Special Scientific Interest SSSI. The Goldcliff Lagoons were created in the late 1990s and form the eastern end of the reserve. The reserve is home to six species of wader birds including lapwing, little ringed plover, oystercatcher, redshank and avocet, the last being unique to the lagoons as the only site in South Wales where they breed. Goldcliff has become a popular venue for birdwatching.

The village pub is The Farmers Arms, located close to the church. The village still has use of a communal parish room located in the Old School at the side of the Monksditch, which there forms the border with Whitson.

Newport Bus provides Demand Responsive Transport, which employs small buses, with wheelchair access, with the same ticketing system as the fixed-line services. The local newspaper is the South Wales Argus which is published in Newport.

Goldcliff Community Council was a member of the Campaign Against the Levels Motorway (CALM) Alliance formed in 2006 by the Friends of the Earth Cymru.

Goldcliff is a popular venue for sea fishing and there are tea rooms, with toilet facilities, at the seawall.

== Government ==
The area is governed by the Newport City Council and the Goldcliff, Newport community council. The village falls within the Llanwern ward of the Newport East parliamentary constituency.
