= Fish trap =

Device used to remotely catch aquatic animals

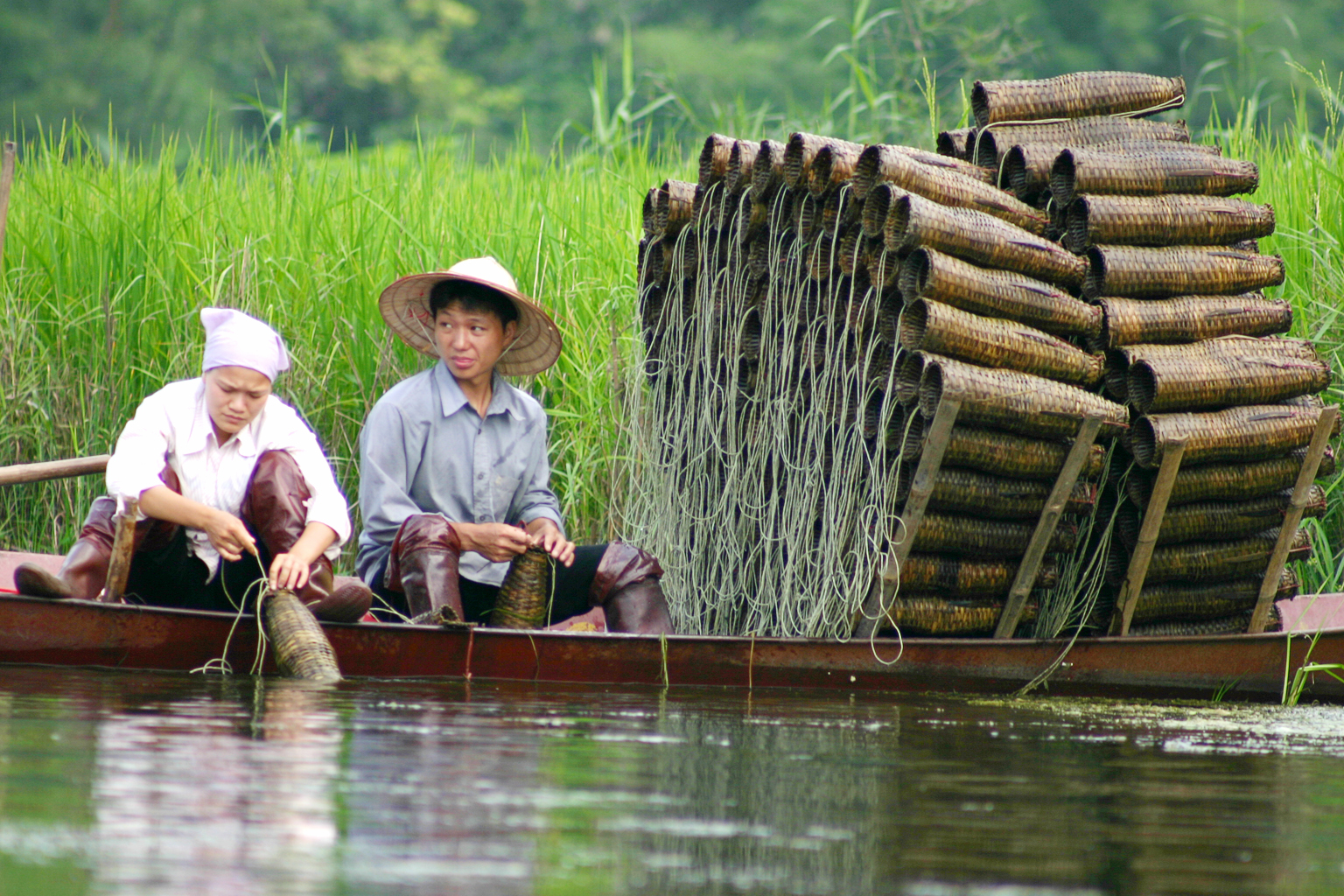
Traditional fish traps, Hà Tây, Vietnam

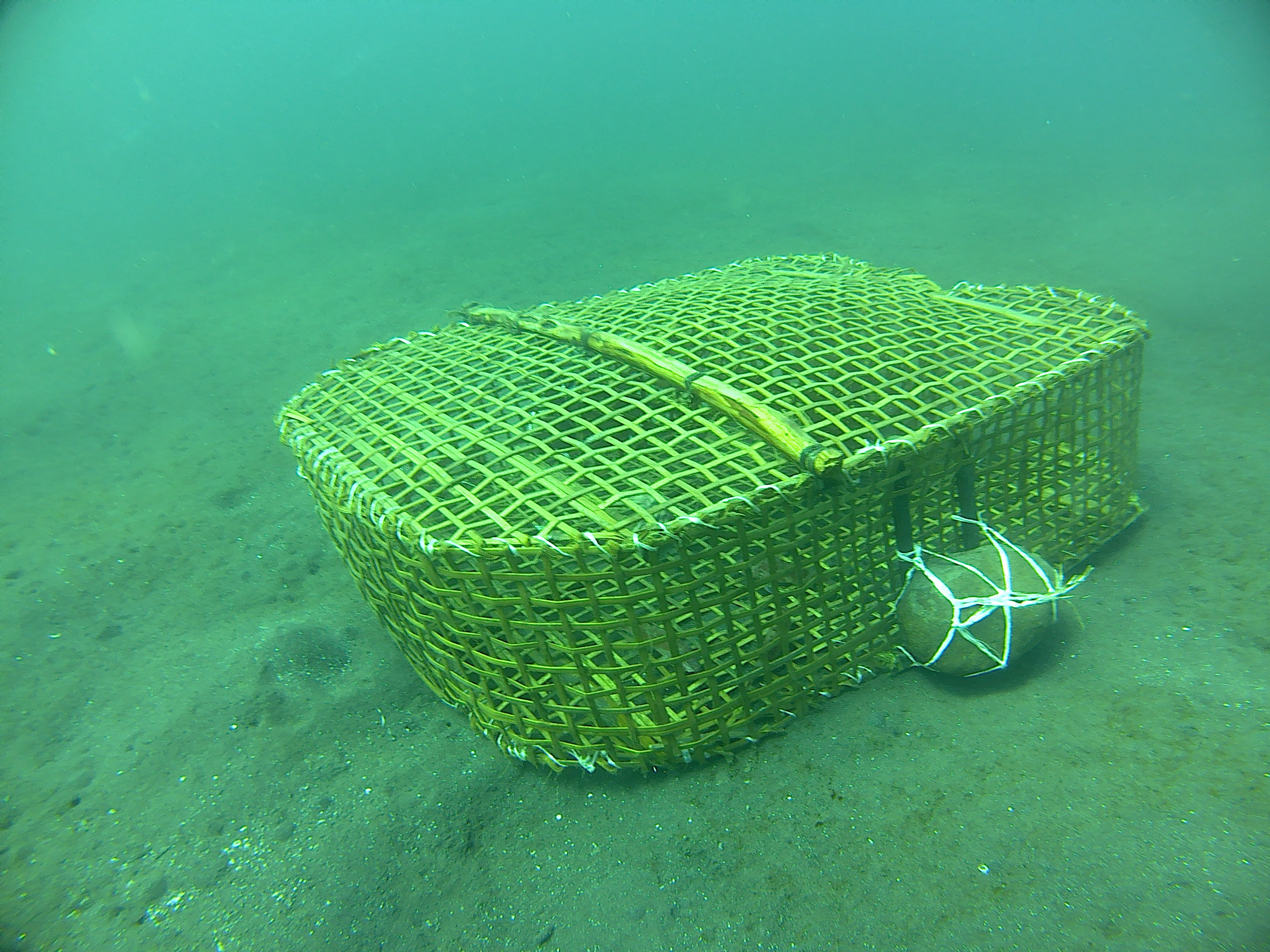
Cage trap at Lembeh Strait, Indonesia

A fish trap is a trap used for catching fish and other aquatic animals of value. Fish traps include fishing weirs, cage traps, fish wheels and some fishing net rigs such as fyke nets.

The use of traps is culturally almost universal around the world and seems to have been independently invented many times. There are two main types of trap, a permanent or semi-permanent structure placed in a river or tidal area and bottle or pot trap that are usually, but not always baited to attract prey, and are periodically lifted out of the water.

A typical contemporary trap consists of a frame of thick steel wire in the shape of a heart, with chicken wire stretched around it. The mesh wraps around the frame and then tapers into the inside of the trap. Fishes that swim inside through this opening cannot get out, as the chicken wire opening bends back into its original narrowness. In earlier times, traps were constructed of wood and fibre. Fish traps contribute to the problems of marine debris and bycatch.

== History ==
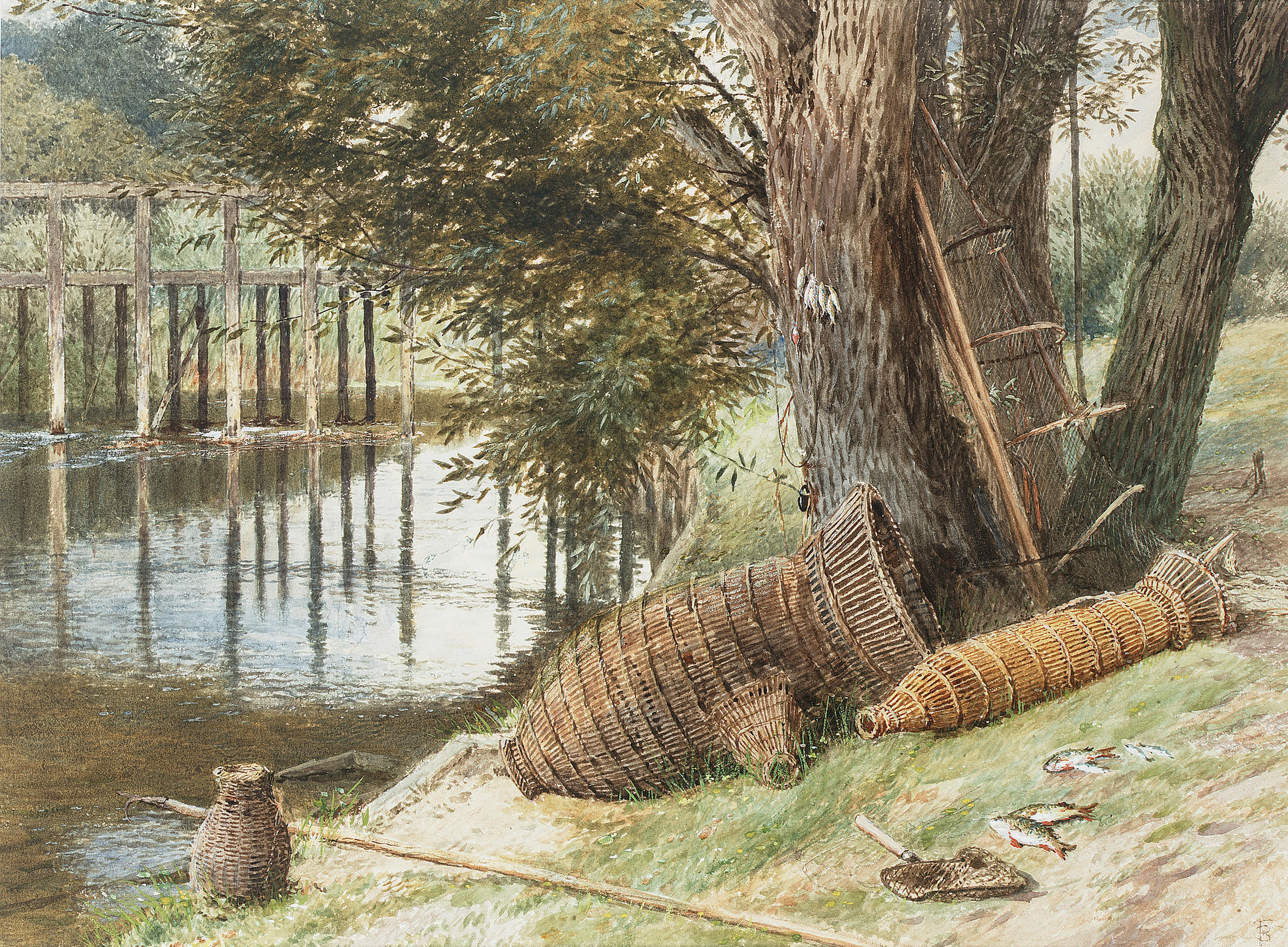
Eel traps in England, 1899, by Myles Birket Foster

The Mediterranean sea has been described as the world's largest fish trap.

Traps are culturally almost universal and seem to have been independently invented many times. There are essentially two types of trap, a permanent or semi-permanent structure placed in a river or tidal area and bottle or pot trap that are usually, but not always baited to attract prey, and are periodically lifted out of the water.

The Mediterranean Sea, with an area of about of 2.5 million km^{2} (970,000 sq mi), is shaped according to the principle of a bottle trap. It is easy for fish from the Atlantic Ocean to swim into the Mediterranean through the narrow neck at Gibraltar, and difficult for them to find their way out. It has been described as "the largest fish trap in the world".

The prehistoric Yaghan people who inhabited the Tierra Del Fuego area constructed stonework in shallow inlets that would effectively confine fish at low tide levels. Some of this extant stonework survives at Bahia Wulaia at the Bahia Wulaia Dome Middens archaeological site.

In southern Italy, during the 17th century, a new fishing technique began to be used. The trabucco is an old fishing machine typical of the coast of Gargano protected as historical monuments by the homonym National Park. This giant trap, built in structural wood, is spread along the coast of southern Adriatic especially in the province of Foggia, in some areas of the Abruzzese coastlines and also in some parts of the coast of southern Tyrrhenian Sea.

The Stilbaai Tidal Fish Traps are ancient intertidal stonewall fish traps that occur in various spots on the Western Cape coast of South Africa from Gansbaai to Mosselbaai. The existing fish traps that can still be seen have been built during the past 300 years, some as recently as the latter part of the 20th century, whilst others could date as far back as 3,000 years.

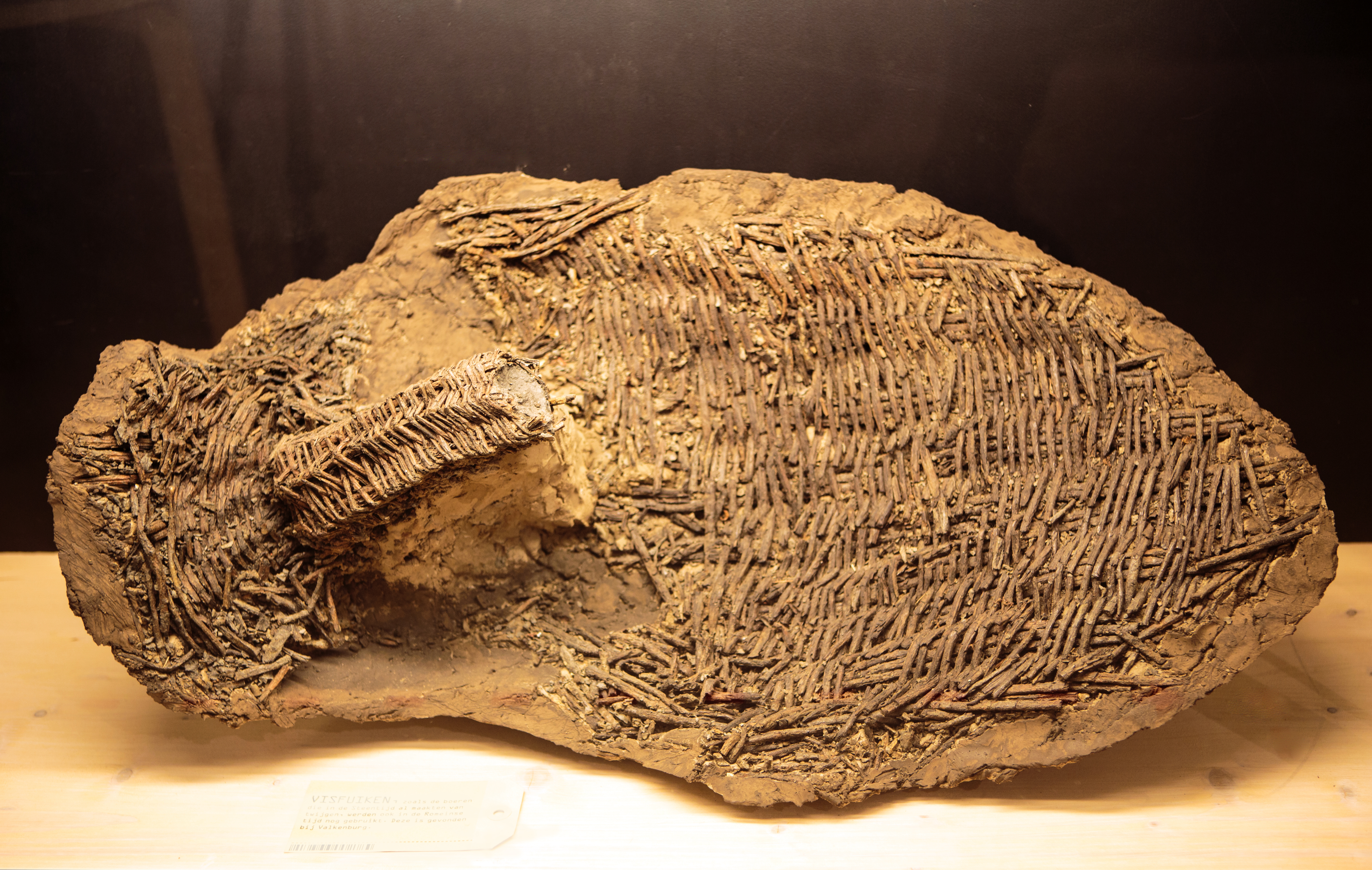
Fish trap, Roman period; found in Valkenburg, the Netherlands

Indigenous Australians were, prior to European colonization, most populous in Australia's better-watered areas such as the Murray-Darling river system of the south-east. Here, where water levels fluctuate seasonally, they constructed ingenious stone fish traps. Most have been completely or partially destroyed. The largest and best-known are those on the Barwon River at Brewarrina, New South Wales, which are at least partly preserved. The Brewarrina fish traps caught huge numbers of migratory native fish as the Barwon River rose in flood and then fell. In southern Victoria, such as at Budj Bim (now a UNESCO world heritage site) indigenous people created an elaborate system of canals, some more than 2 km long. The purpose of these canals was to attract and catch eels, a fish of short coastal rivers (as opposed to rivers of the Murray-Darling system). The eels were caught by a variety of traps including stone walls constructed across canals with a net placed across an opening in the wall. Traps at different levels in the marsh came into operation as the water level rose and fell. The traps at Budj Bim are seen as a form of Indigenous aquaculture dating back at least 6,600 years (older than the Pyramids of Giza), with the Muldoon traps system seen as the world's oldest stone walled fish trap, and longest used fish trap in the world.

Somewhat similar stone-wall traps were constructed by Native American Pit River people in north-eastern California. In South Australia, the Barngarla people of Eyre Peninsula combined the use of fish traps with singing "to call sharks and dolphins to chase the fish into the fish traps, where the Barngarla people would appear to spear and stone the fish."

A technique called dam fishing is used by the Baka pygmies. This involves the construction of a temporary dam resulting in a drop in the water levels downstream— allowing fish to be easily collected.

== Types and methods ==
The manner in which fish traps are used depends on local conditions and the behaviour of the local fish. For example, a fish trap might be placed in shallow water near rocks where pikes like to lie. If placed correctly, traps can be very effective. It is usually not necessary to check the trap daily, since the fish remain alive inside the trap, relatively unhurt. Because of this, the trap also allows for the release of undersized fish as per fishing regulations.

Fish traps contribute to the problem of marine debris, unless they are made of biodegradable material, says a United Nations report. For example, fishers lost 31,600 crab traps in the Bristol Bay (Alaska) in a period of two years. Each year, fisheries in Chesapeake Bay (Northeastern United States) lose or abandon 12 to 20 percent of their crab traps, according to a government report. These traps continue to trap animals. Fish traps can also trap protected species such as platypus in Australia.

=== Portable traps ===
These are usually in the shape of a pot or bottle.

Name	Image	Description
Atlantic cod pot		In 2017 research was reported on the suitability of using baited fishing pots for catching Atlantic cod. Stocks of this once popular commercial fish appear to be recovering after a major fishery collapse. The use of appropriately designed pots can have less environmental impact than other fishing strategies, but to be practical they need to catch their targets both efficiently and selectively.
Basic bottle trap		Bottle traps are also known as pot traps. This type of trap is portable, and is used to catch small fish and other small aquatic animals. It consists of a container shaped somewhat like a bottle, usually with an inverted funnel at the entrance. It can be constructed from a plastic bottle, or a glass jar or earthenware pot, or woven with wire or flax. The trap is lowered into the water on a line, where it is left either at the bottom, or suspended at some depth beneath the surface. Bait is usually, but not always used to lure the prey inside. Variants of this basic trap have been used from early times in countries around the world.
Bubu trap		Bubu (also spelled "bubo" or "bobo") are traditional fish traps in Southeast Asian countries such as Brunei, Malaysia, and the Philippines, specialized for catching fish in the uneven terrain of coral reefs. They are usually box-shaped or dome-shaped and are made from bamboo or rattan strips woven into hexagonal shapes. They vary in size and shape depending on the topography and current conditions of the locales they are used in. They have a wide opening at one end that narrows into an inverted funnel. They are used with or without baits and have weights or stones placed inside. They are placed on site then retrieved later. They are traditionally not marked with buoys, to avoid theft by other fishermen. Their locations are remembered via shoreline landmarks.
Crab trap		Different types of crab traps are used depending on regional preferences, the type of crab targeted and the underwater topography. Typically, they are constructed as wire cages, as shown in the image.
Eel trap		The Māori people of New Zealand crafted elaborate eel traps, known as hīnaki, by skillfully weaving them from the stems of various climbing plants such as mangemange, or the aerial roots of kiekie. The finest of these traps were masterpieces of artistry.
Fyke net		A fyke net is made from a bag-shaped net held open by hoops. These can be linked together in long chains, and are used to catch eels in rivers. Fyke nets equipped with wings and leaders are used in sheltered places in lakes where there is plenty of plant life. Hundreds of these nets can be connected into systems where it is not practical to build large fixed structures.
Katiska trap		A katiska is a portable fish trap used in Finland. It is a lightweight and made from chicken wire. The trap can either be collapsible or rigid, and is easily placed at any depth since it needs no anchoring. Katiska are commonly used in hobby fishing, since they catch only a small number of fish. The photo shows a fisherman checking a katiska.
Lobster pot		A lobster pot is a portable trap used to trap lobsters or crayfish. An opening permits the lobster to enter a tunnel of netting. Lobster pots are usually constructed in two parts from wire and wood. The lobster enters the first part, called the "chamber" or "kitchen", where there is bait. It then moves into the "parlour", where it is trapped. Lobster pots can hold several lobsters. They are usually dropped to the sea floor about a dozen at a time, and are marked by a buoy so they can be picked up later.
Octopus trap		In Japan, the Mediterranean, and other regions, an ancient variant is used to catch octopuses. They are usually heavy earthenware pots, and do not have an inverted funnel. These traps are left on the sea floor for days at a time. Octopuses enter and remain inside, using the pot as shelter and protection. No bait is used. When the pot is raised, the octopus will not normally try to escape. See also ja:蛸壺 and piège à poulpe in Tunisia.
Soda bottle or glass jar trap		In Haikou, China, local people make bottle traps with small, glass jars. Local craftspeople produce a variant made from a two-litre soda bottle. This type has an inverted funnel made by cutting off the top of the bottle a few centimetres down the neck, and making vertical cuts downward. This produces tabs which are then pushed inward, producing the inverted funnel shape. A stone is attached to the side of the bottle, and several meters of line are provided. Numerous holes are drilled through the bottle to allow water to enter and escape. These are sold by the seaside for 6 yuan, along with a small bag of flour for bait.
Salambáw		Salambaw are traditional raft-operated lift nets widely used in the Philippines. It consists of a raft with a tower structure with a crane mechanism attached to two crossing spars with a large square-shaped net stretched in between. They are lowered and raised every few minutes to catch fish. They may use lights to attract fish at night. There are numerous variations of salambaw in the Philippines: a small hand-carried variant used to catch crabs is known as bintol; deep-water variants used to catch chambered nautilus is known as panak; stationary shore-based variants are known as tangkal; and variants operated from large outrigger boats are known as basnig.
Stickleback trap		The stickleback trap is a variant of the soda bottle trap.

=== Fixed and semi-fixed structures ===
Name	Image	Description
Almadraba		Almadraba is an ancient Andalusian way of catching tuna. It is an elaborate way of setting nets in a maze that leads to a central killing pool. In Sicily the mazes of nets, and also the places where the nets are set are called Tonnara, and the overall method of capturing the fishes is called Mattanza. This takes place during spring and the beginning of summer when tuna tend to go into the Mediterranean.
Barrier net		Barrier nets, locally known as sagpang or sirada, is a type of traditional fish trap originating from the Philippines. It is adapted to catch fish during tidal cycles in mangrove environments with large water level fluctuations. It consists simply of a series of poles built into the substrate surrounding a mangrove area. Nets are strung to the poles by two rope systems. The bottom part is attached and carefully kept in contact with the substrate. The top part of the net is lowered when the tide is coming in, allowing fish and crustaceans to pass through. When the tide begins to recede, the nets are raised and tied to the top part of the poles, trapping the fish and crustaceans. These are collected by simply picking them up at low tide.
Charfia		A Tunisian passive fixed fishery system consisting of palm fronds embedded in the seabed to create triangular barriers, blocking the path of the fish, octopuses, and squid pulled in by the ebb tide and channelling them into capture chambers and finally into a net or trap. The charfias are rebuilt every year, and operated only between the autumn equinox and June to ensure that marine wildlife has a biological rest period. Charfia fishing is prevalent in the Kerkennah Islands (listed as UNESCO Intangible Cultural Heritage of Humanity), but also used in Chebba and to a lesser extend near Zarzis and on the island of Djerba.
Tidal stone fish weir		Tidal stone fish weirs are one of the ancestral fishing technologies of the seafaring Austronesian peoples. They are found on tidal estuaries and shallow coastal waters throughout regions settled by Austronesians during the Austronesian expansion (c. 3000 to 1500 BCE). They are usually semicircular in shape, with an opening towards the direction of the ebb tide. They are passive traps that depend on the tides to bring in and trap fish. They are found in the highest concentrations in Penghu Island in Taiwan, the Philippines, and all throughout Micronesia. They are also prevalent in eastern Indonesia, Melanesia, and Polynesia. Around 500 stone weirs survive in Taiwan (a notable example being the Double-Heart of Stacked Stones), and millions of stone weirs used to exist through all of the islands of Micronesia. The technology of tidal stone fish weirs has also spread to neighboring regions when Taiwan came under the jurisdiction of China and Imperial Japan in recent centuries.
Fish corral		A fish corral (natively known as baklad or bungsod) is a traditional stationary trap placed in reef flats. They originate from the Philippines where they remain in widespread use. They are a variant of the Austronesian tidal stone weir, but differs in that its made with perishable materials like bamboo or wood. They are passive traps that rely on the tides to bring in fish. Fish corrals have a distinctive arrow-like shape. The seaward side consists of a long barrier (the "leader") that guides fish directly into a narrow slit entrance. The entrance opens up into a semi-circular or heart-shaped enclosure called the "playground". On the protruding edges of the playground are smaller heart-shaped enclosures called the "bunt", where the fish are forced into once the tides recede and are caught. Fish corrals are traditionally made from bamboo posts and slats with fine-meshed nets connecting the poles. They range in size from 30 to 100 m (98 to 328 ft) wide. Variants of fish corrals called taba have openings that face shore-ward. They catch fish as the tides recede. They can have V-shaped leading barriers and differ in the placement and orientation of the enclosures and the bunt. A highly simplified version of fish corrals is the tagbacoe, which do not have playgrounds. Instead it consists of V-shaped "wings" that lead directly into the bunt. Tagbacoe are generally lit at night to attract fish and crustaceans and do not rely on tides.
Fish nest		Fish nests (sometimes called "miracle holes"; natively known by various names like amatong, balirong, gango, tambon, etc.) is a traditional fish trap originating from the Philippines. It is a fish aggregating device, essentially an artificial reef, consisting of a conical pile of mangrove wood, waterlogged bamboo, rocks, and/or other materials that sink (like old car tires and PVC pipes). They vary in size from 2 to 3 m (6.6 to 9.8 ft) in diameter and 0.5 to 1.5 m (1.6 to 4.9 ft) in height. They may also sometimes be placed inside excavated holes around 1 m (3.3 ft) deep and around 1 to 3 metres (3.3 to 9.8 ft) wide and long. They are constructed in shallow tidal waters and left alone for 2 to 3 months for epibiota to grow on the materials and attract fish. Afterwards, it is harvested once every 2 to 3 weeks. Harvesting is accomplished by encircling the fish nest with a net. The fisherman then wades inside and tosses the fish nest materials one by one outside the net, leaving the fish and other crustaceans inside exposed. These are then chased into a tapered pocket in the middle of the net and caught.
Fish weir		A fishing weir is an obstruction placed in tidal waters or wholly or partially across a river, which is designed to hinder the passage of fish. Traditionally they were built from wood or stones. Fish such as salmon can be trapped when they attempt to swim upstream, other fish such as eels can be trapped when they attempt to migrate downstream. As fish traps, fishing weirs date back to the Bronze Age in Sweden and to Roman times in the UK. They were used by native North Americans and early settlers to catch fish for trade and to feed their communities.
Fish wheel		A fish wheel is a device for catching fish which operates much as a water-powered mill wheel. A wheel complete with baskets and paddles is attached to a floating dock. The wheel rotates due to the current of the stream it is placed into. The baskets on the wheel capture fish traveling upstream. The fish caught in the baskets fall into a holding tank. When the holding tank is full, the fish are removed.
Putcher		Putcher traps are ancient traps used for catching salmon. They are peculiar to the River Severn in Great Britain. A putcher is a conical-shaped basket about five feet long. A number of putchers are tied together in rows standing four or five feet high to form a "rank". The rank is set against the incoming or outgoing tide. Traditionally putchers were made of hazel rods with willow plait. More modern baskets can use steel or aluminium wire.
Trabucco		A trabucco is a shore-operated lift net, a platform anchored to rocks by large logs of Aleppo pine. Two or more long wooden arms jut out into the sea, where they suspend a narrow-meshed net some feet above the water. They are found along the coast of Gargano, where they are protected as historical monuments. Another variant is found along the coasts of Abruzzo and Molise, where they are installed in shallower waters, and use a platform which runs parallel to the coast instead of jutting out into the water.
Wagenya trap		The Wagenya people, in the Congo, build a huge system of wooden tripods across the river. These tripods are anchored on the holes naturally carved in the rock by the water current. To these tripods are anchored large baskets, which are lowered in the rapids to "sieve" the waters for fish. The baskets are designed and sized to trap only large fish. The Wagenya lift the baskets twice daily to check for fish, which are retrieved by swimmers.

== More images ==
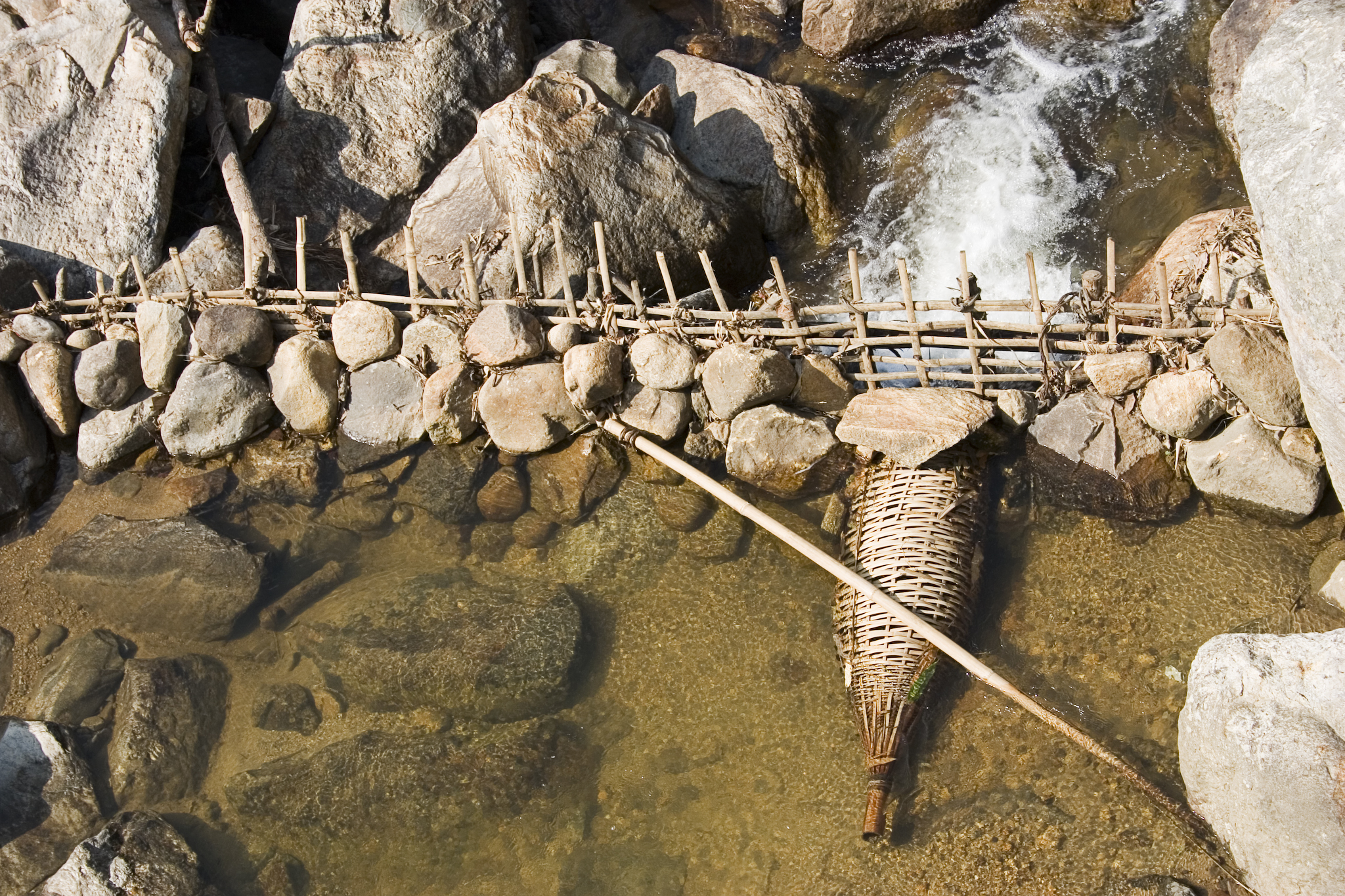
Traditional trap in Vietnam

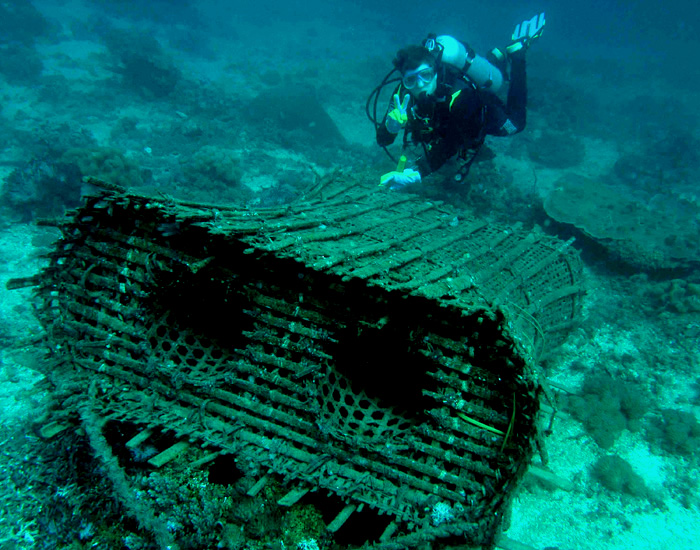
Traditional trap in East Timor

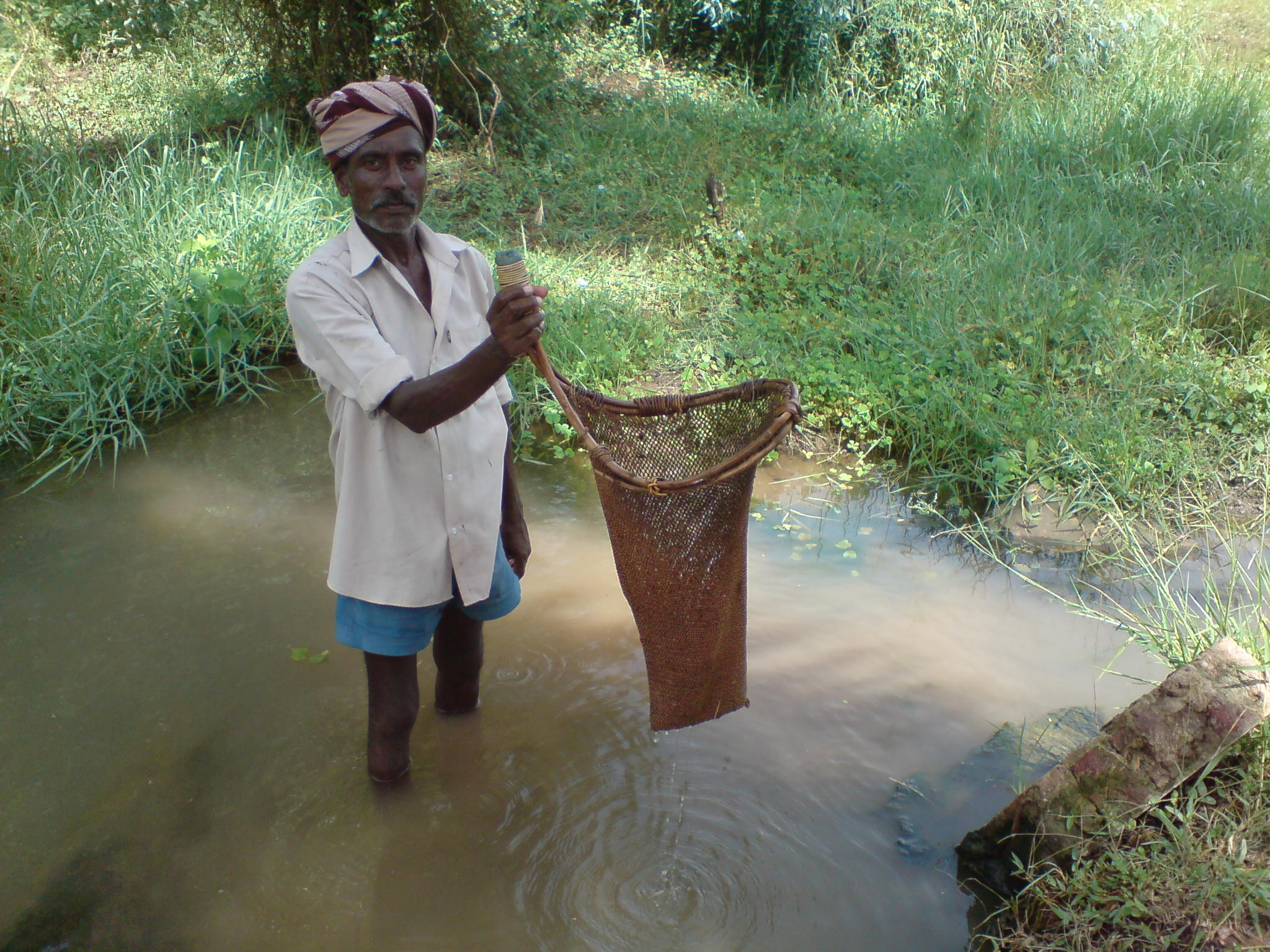
Trap used in Tamil Nadu

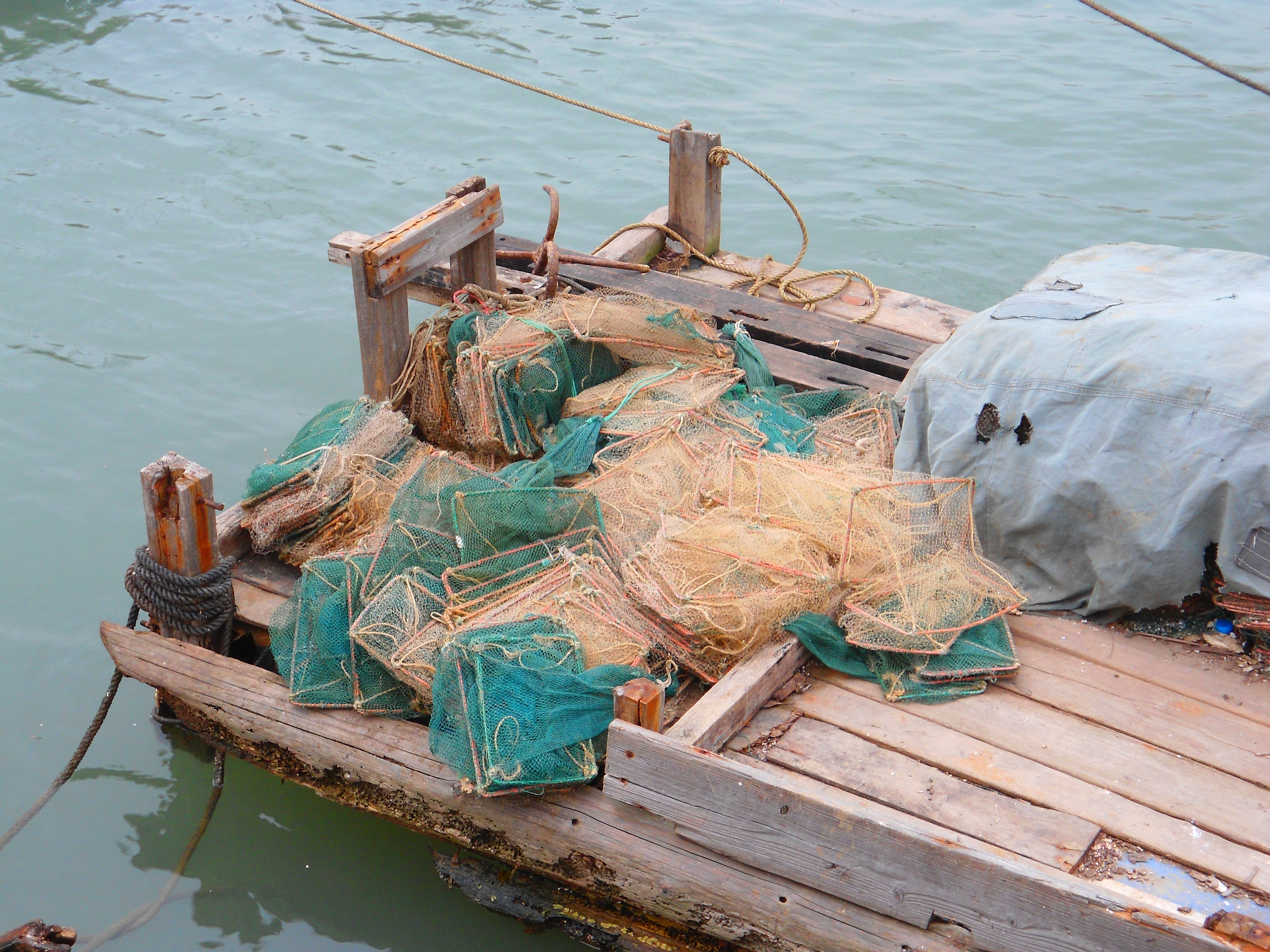
Eel traps in Haikou, China

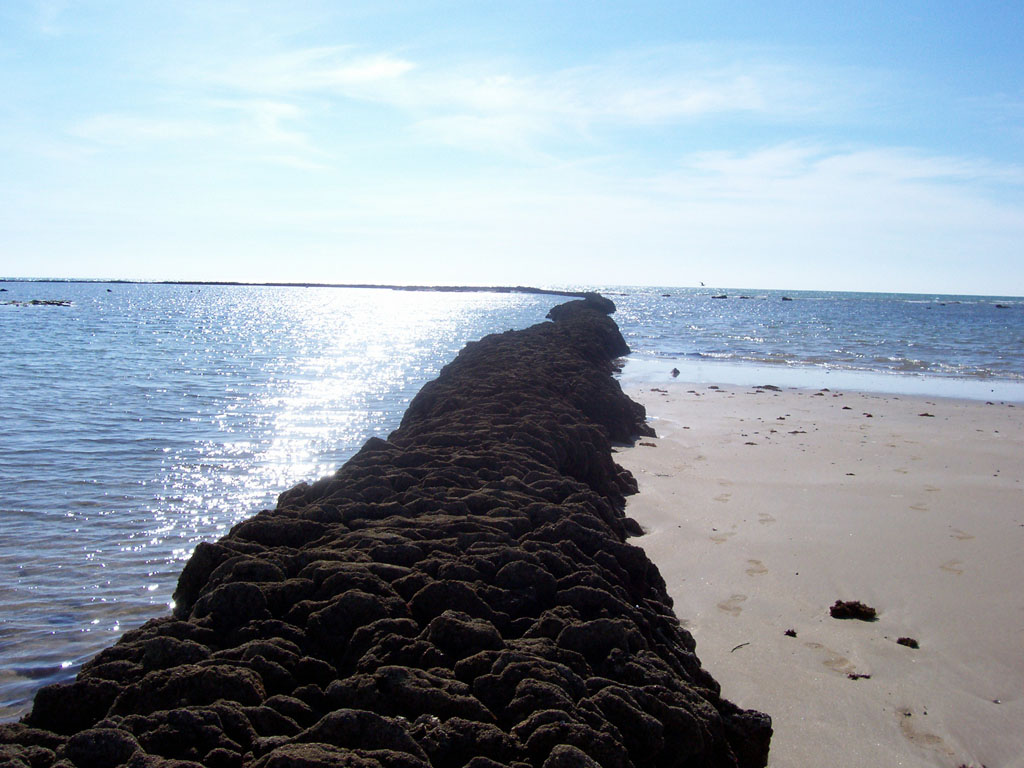
Fish corral in Rota, southern Spain

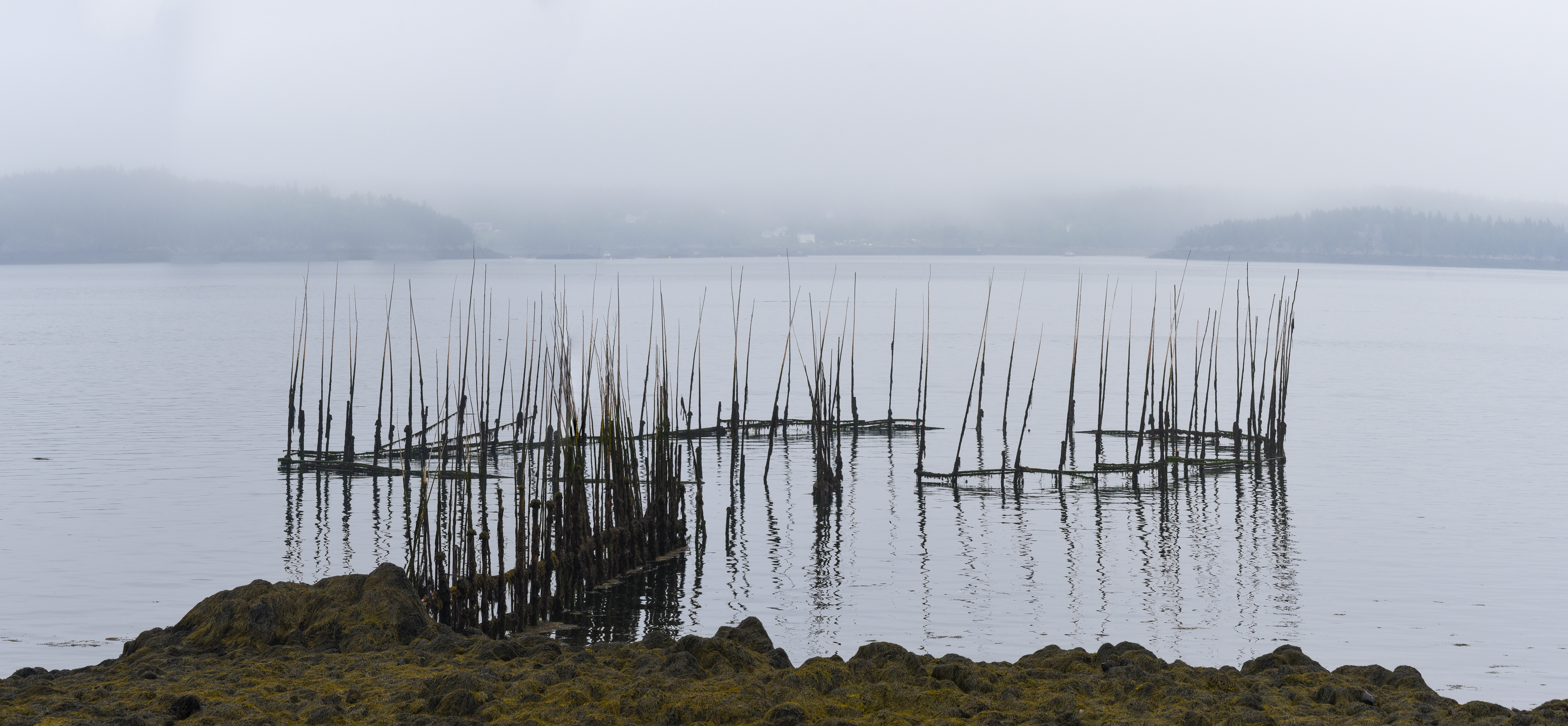
Native American fish trap near Eastport, Maine USA

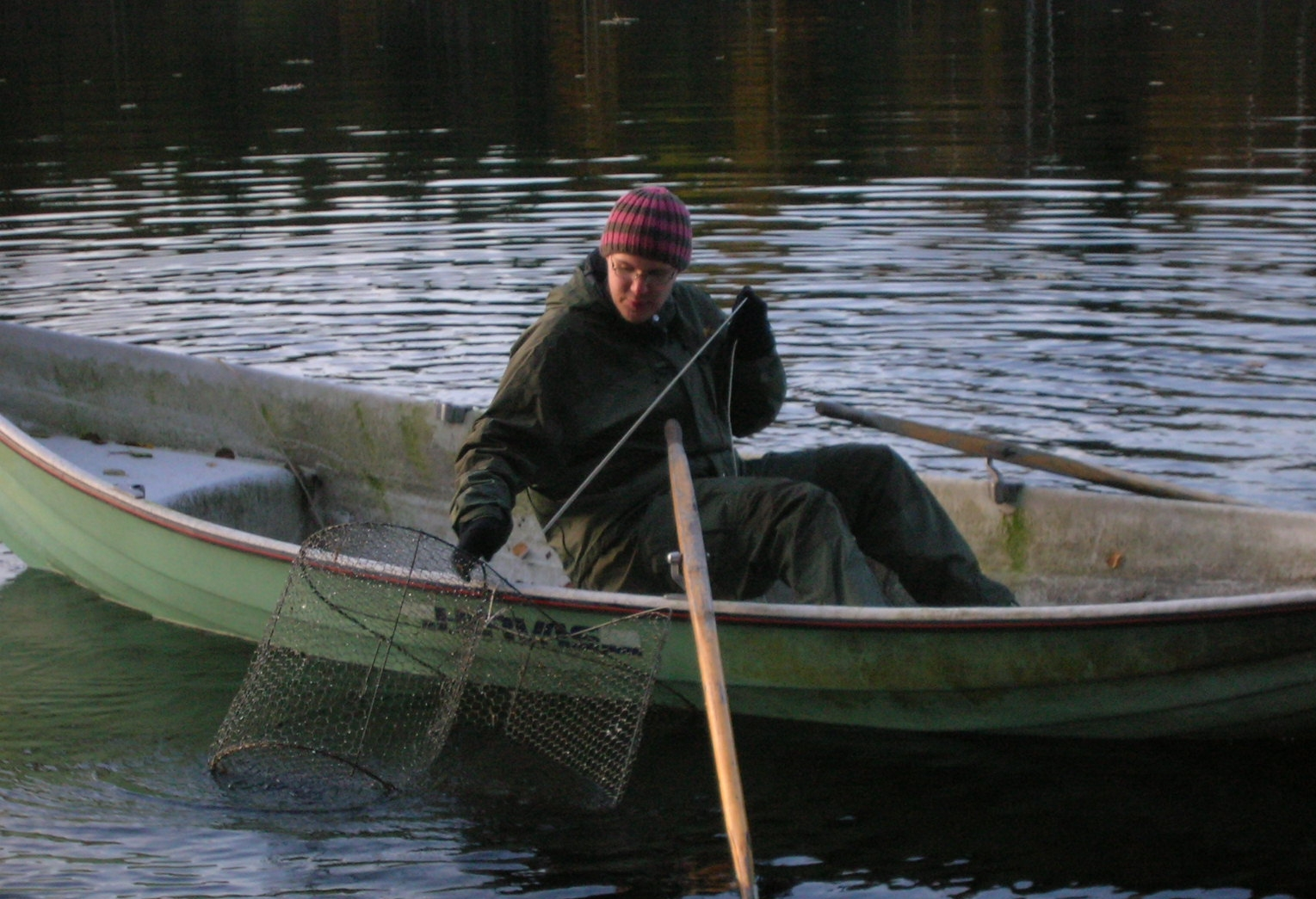
Finnish fish trap (Katiska)

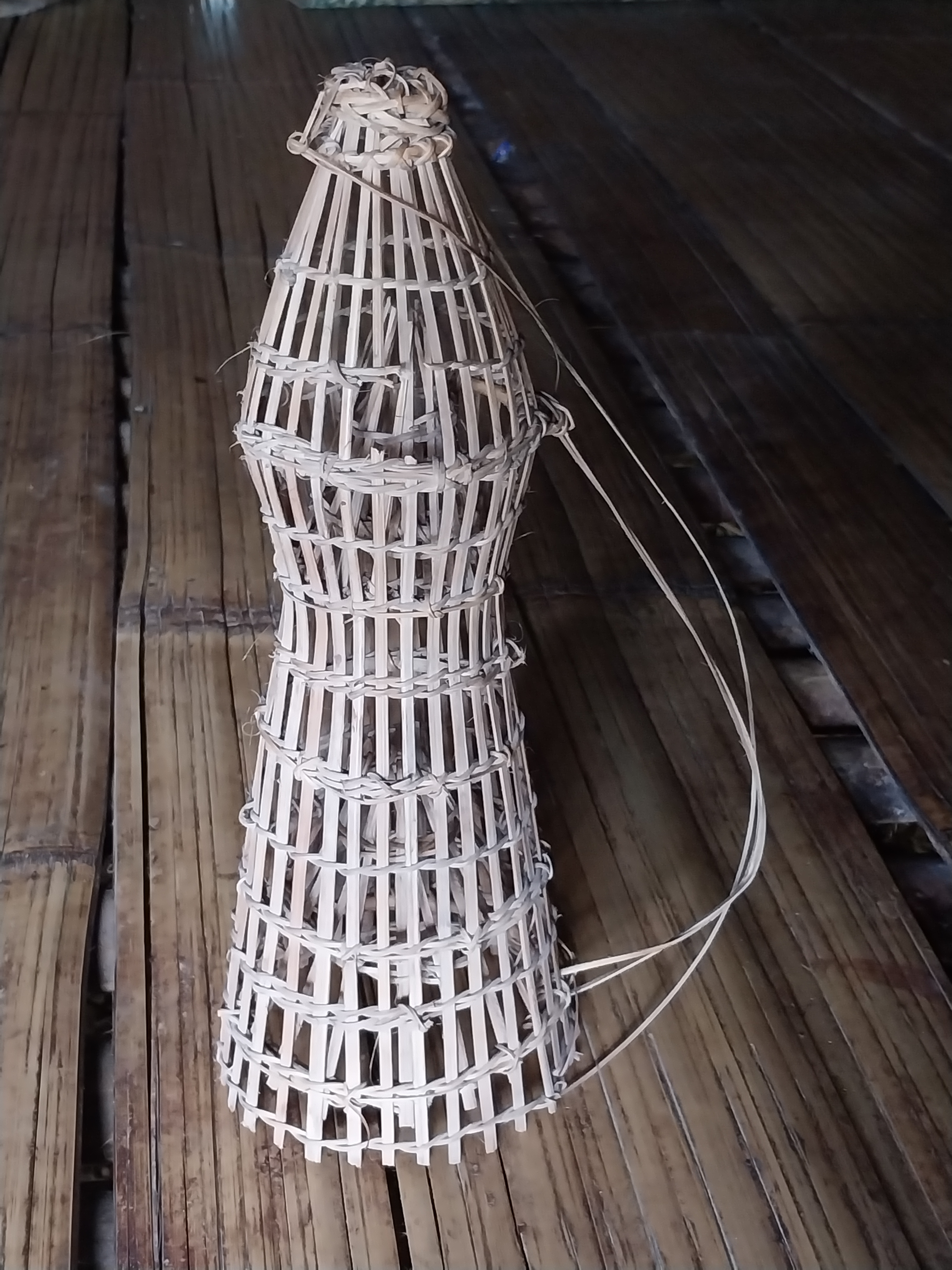
A Mendriq bubu fish trap.

== See also ==
- Fishing net
- Animal trapping
- Eel buck
