= Eel buck =

Trap for fish

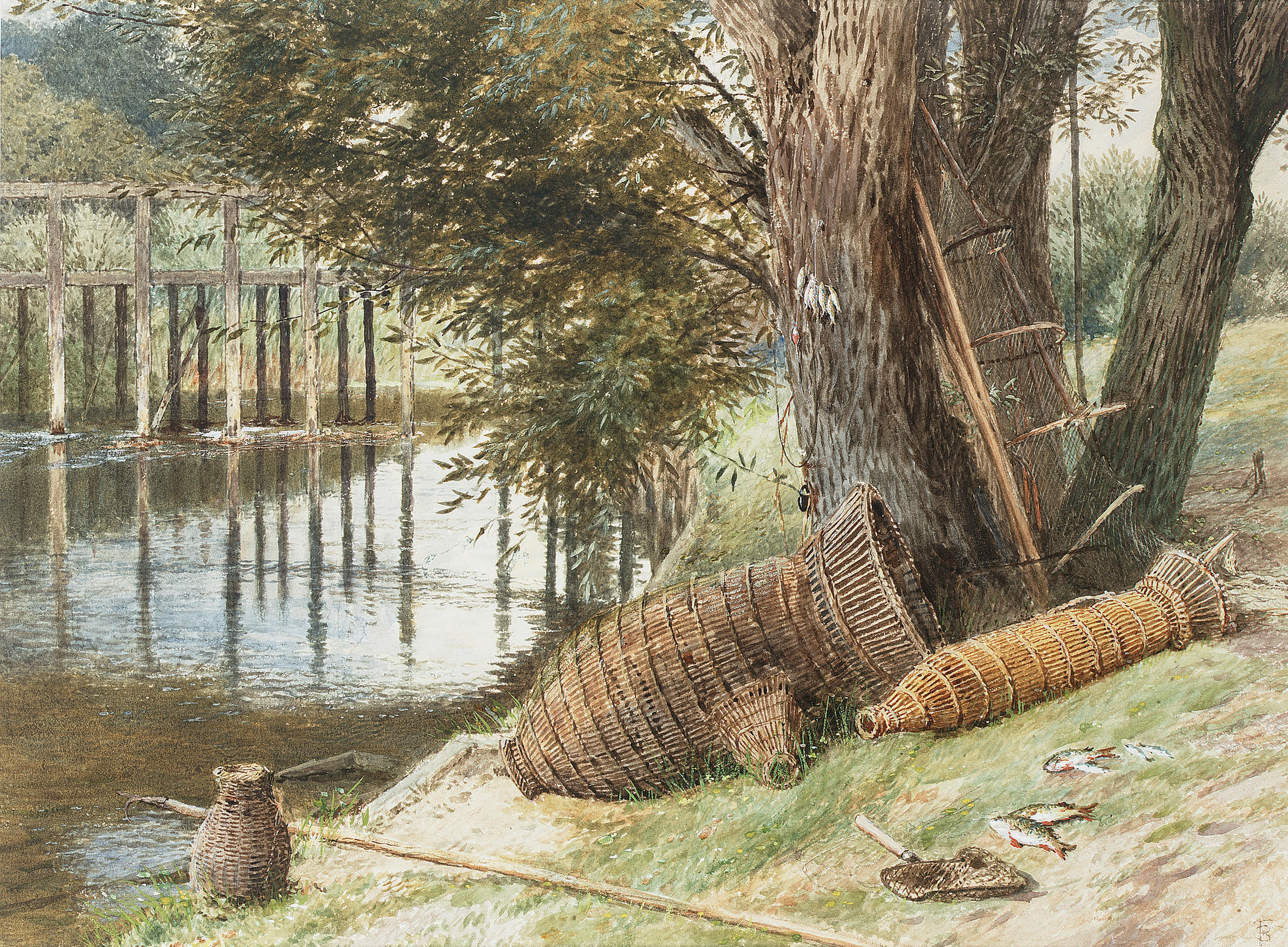
The Eel Traps, an 1899 painting by Myles Birket Foster

An eel buck or eel basket is a type of fish trap that was prevalent in the River Thames in England up to the 20th century. It was used particularly to catch eels, which were a staple part of the London diet.

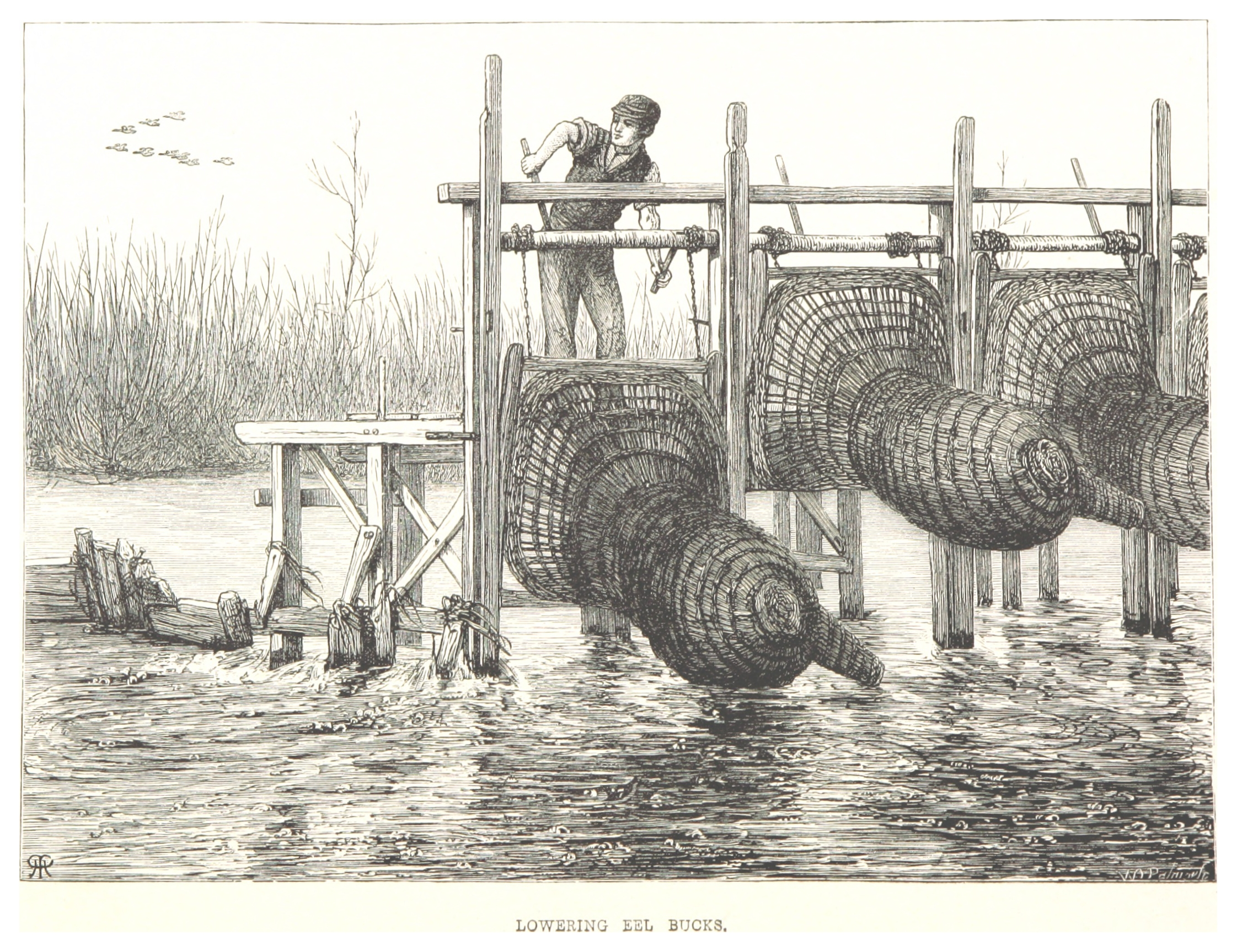
Eel bucks on the River Thames, 1875

Eel bucks were baskets made of willow wood, and were often strung together in a fishing weir. Construction of such weirs was outlawed under the terms of Magna Carta in 1215:

All fish-weirs shall be removed from the Thames, the Medway, and throughout the whole of England, except on the sea coast.

This was intended to keep the rivers navigable by boat, however the practice continued unabated.

Several islands in the River Thames reflect the presence of bucks at those points; for example, Buck Ait and Handbuck Eyot.

A surviving eel buck may be seen on the River Test at 51°7′48″N 1°29′5″W.

== See also ==
- Eel ladder
- Putcher
