= Putcher fishing =

Fishing method for salmon

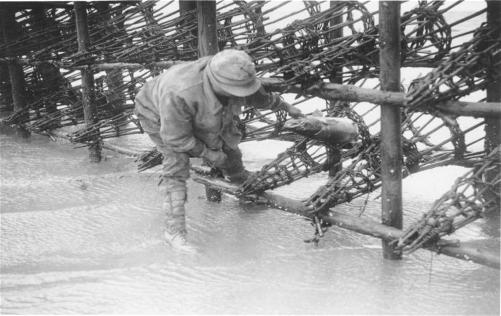
George Whittaker collecting salmon from putchers at Goldcliff, circa 1923

Putcher fishing is a type of fishing (usually of salmon) which employs multiple putcher baskets, set in a fixed wooden frame, against the tide in a river estuary, notably on the River Severn, in England and South East Wales. Putchers are placed in rows, standing four or five high, in a wooden "rank" set out against the incoming and/or outgoing tides.

Traditionally the putcher was made of hazel rods with withy (willow) plait, both materials being grown locally on the Caldicot and Wentloog Levels. Modern baskets made of steel or aluminium wire were introduced in the 1940s and 1950s.

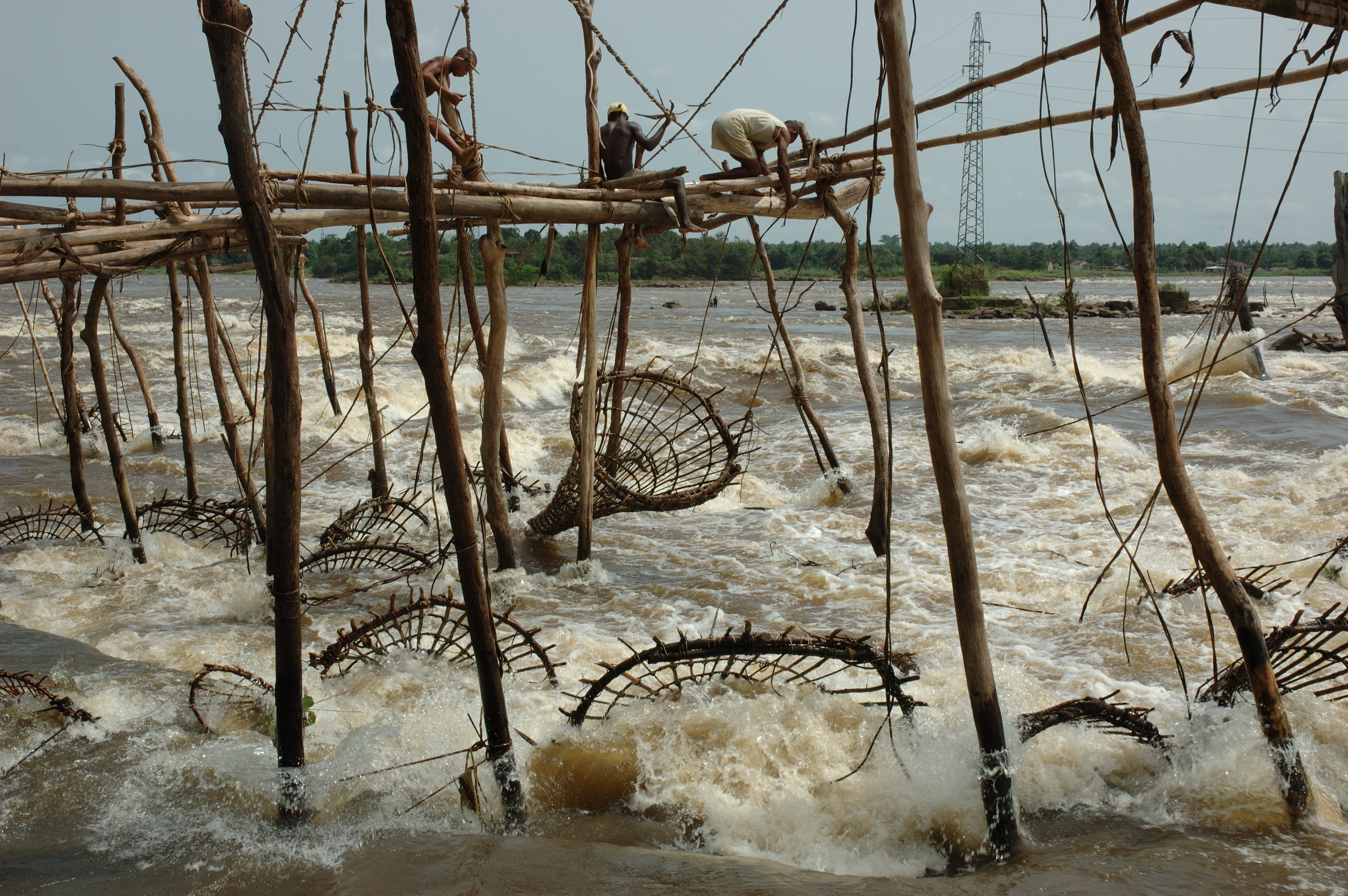
Conical baskets on a wooden frame are also used elsewhere; here, Wagenya, to catch the fish thrown downstream by rapids at the Boyoma Falls (aka: Stanley or Kisangani falls) on the Lualaba River, near Kisangani in the Democratic Republic of the Congo. As in the UK, fishing spots are inherited.

== See also ==
- Eel basket
- Fish trap
- Basket weaving
- Snare trap
