= Wagenya =

Place in the Democratic Republic of the Congo

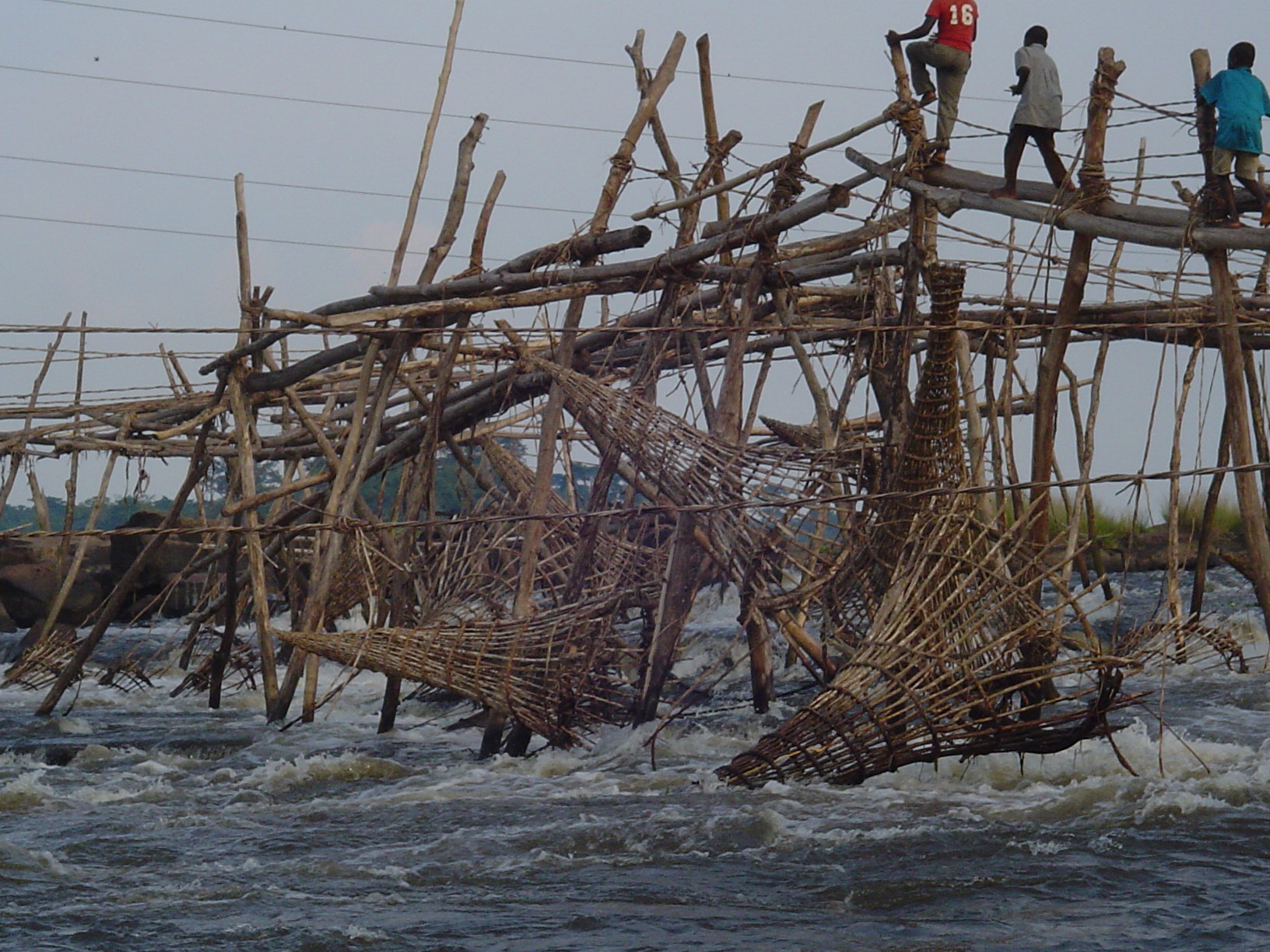
Fishing method of Wagenya people.

Wagenya is the name of a place in the Democratic Republic of the Congo and of the people living there; situated in the northern part of Congo, by the city of Kisangani and on the lower reaches of the Boyoma Falls. As a result, the seventh and last cataract on the Boyoma is named the Wagenia Falls.

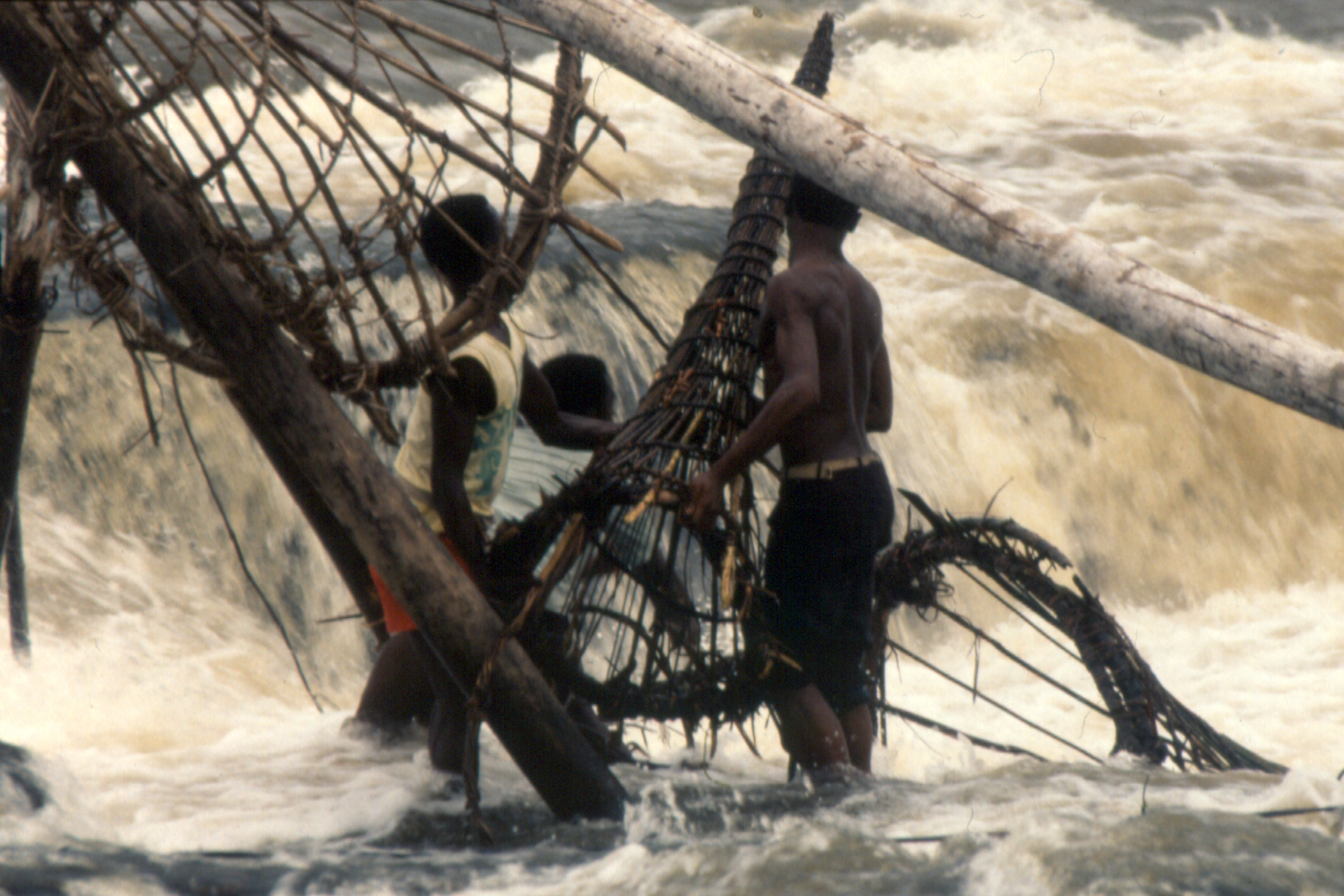
The Wagenya peoples are indigenous fishermen who have developed a unique technique to fish in the river. They build a huge system of wooden tripods across the river. These tripods are anchored on the holes naturally carved in the rock by the water current. To these tripods are anchored large fish trap baskets, which are lowered in the rapids to “sieve” the waters for fish. It is a very selective fishing method, as these baskets are quite big and only large fish are entrapped.

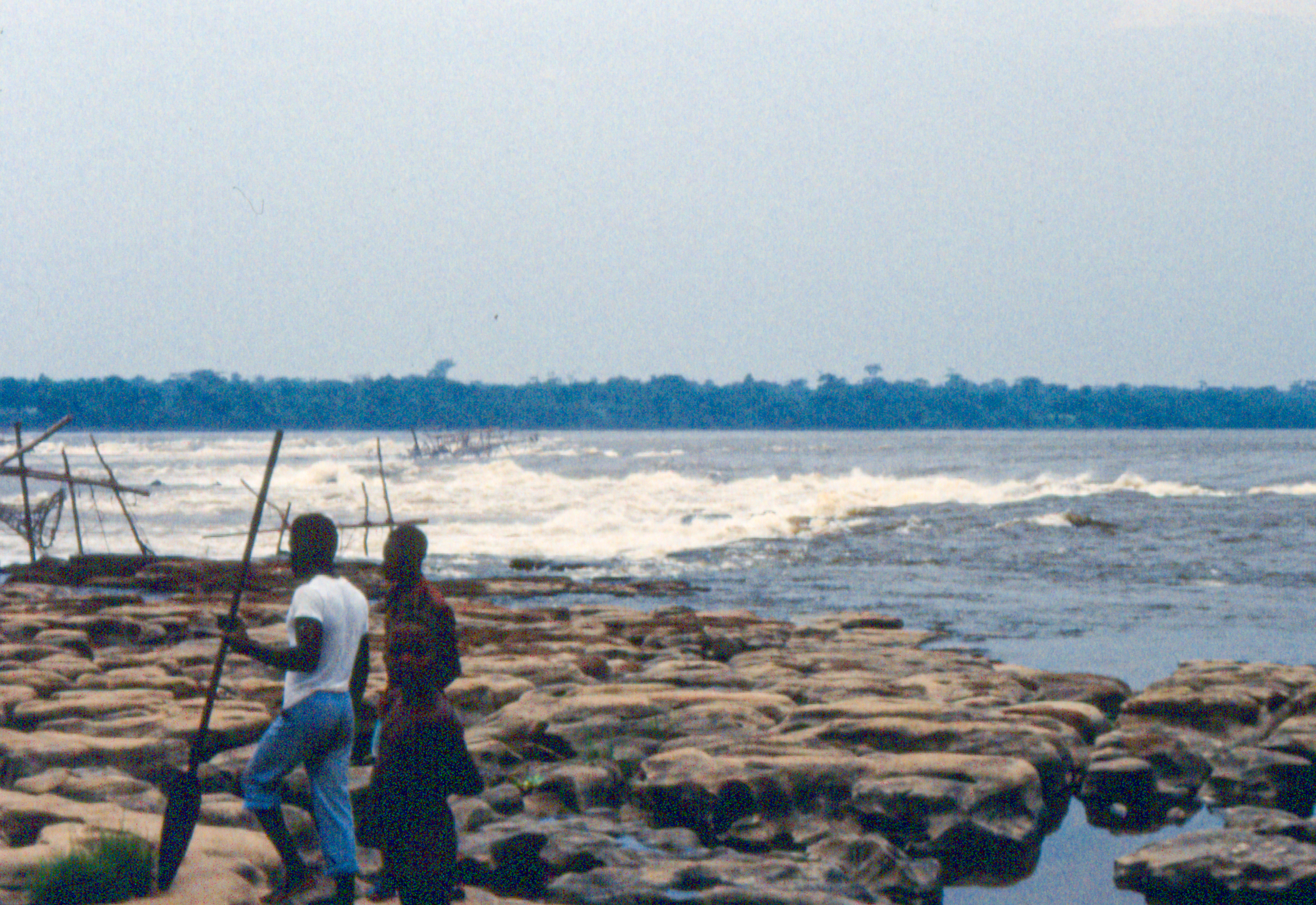
Seventh cataract of Boyoma/Stanley Falls near Kisangani.

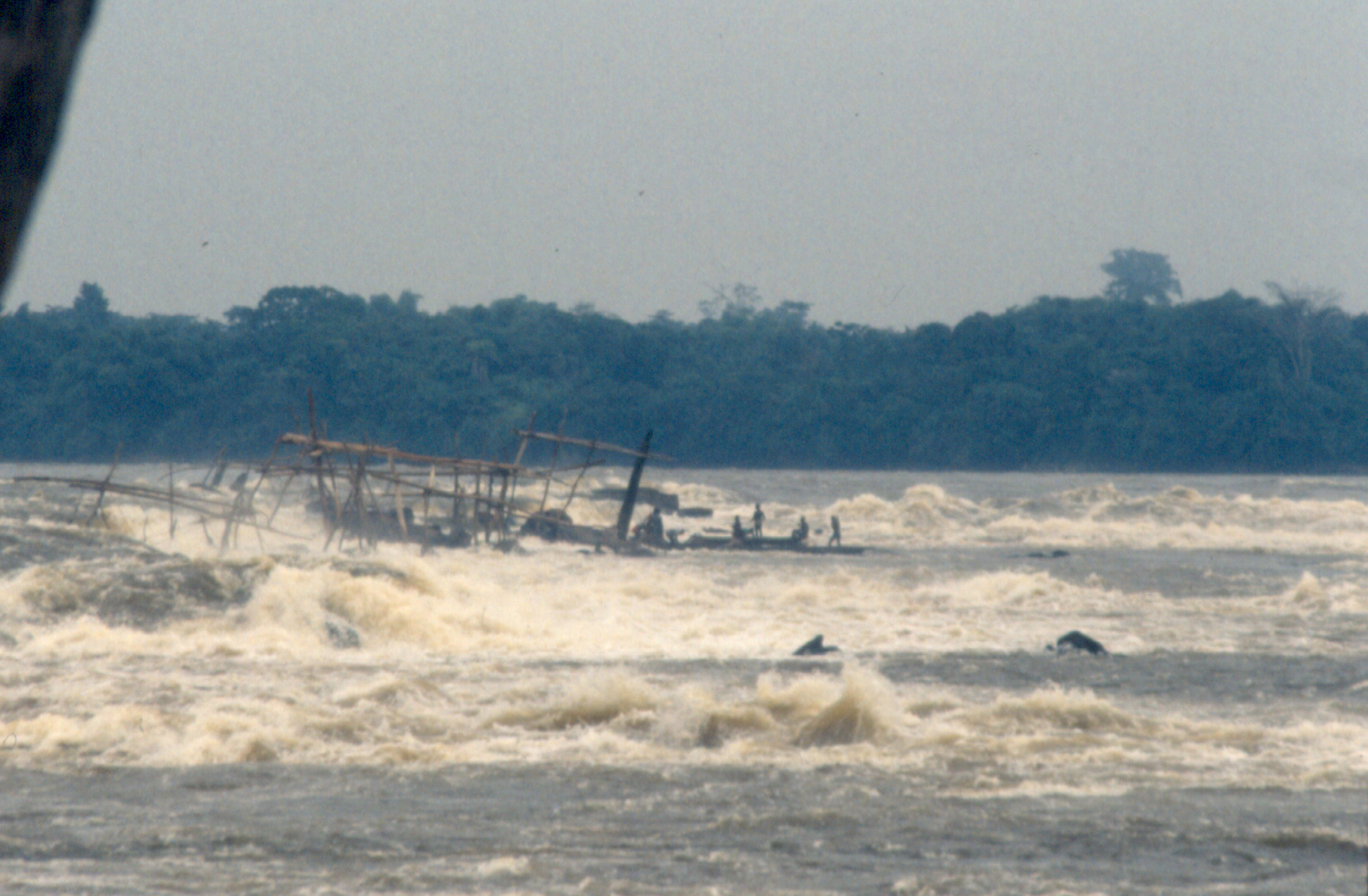
Last rapid with Wagenia fishermen.

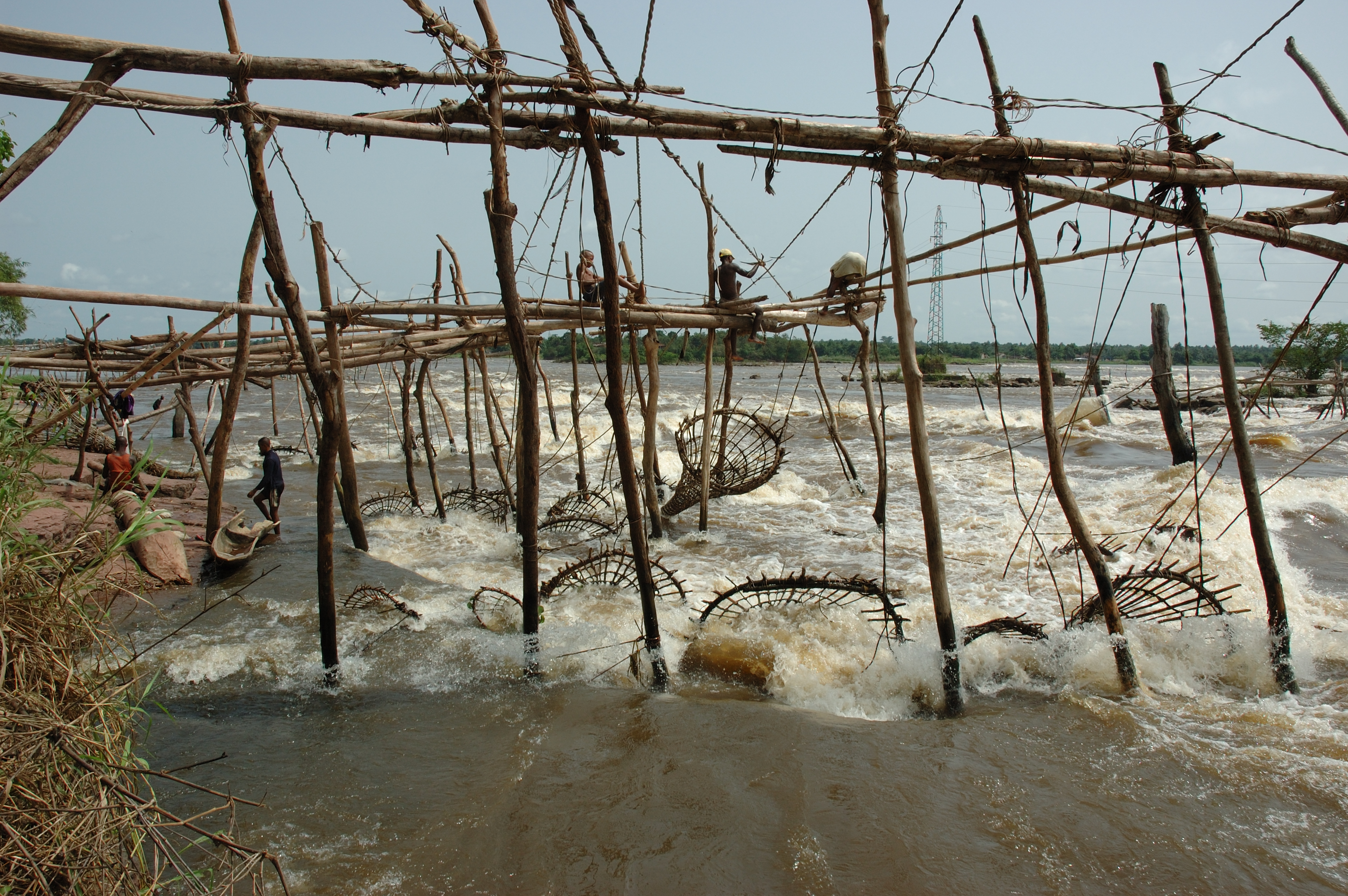
Wagenia fishermen in the falls at Kisangani.

Because of low rock banks, at this point the Congo River is not anymore navigable and it creates rapids. For centuries, people living there have fished in a rather interesting way. They build a huge system of wooden tripods across the river. These tripods are anchored on the holes naturally carved in the rock by the water current. To these tripods are anchored large baskets, which are lowered in the rapids to "sieve" the waters for fish. It is a very selective fishing method, as these baskets are quite big and only large fish are entrapped. Twice a day the adult Wagenya people pull out these baskets to check if there is any fish caught; in which case somebody will dive into the river to fetch it. At the end of each day the product of this ancient way of fishing is divided among all the members of the same family; including also those who did not take direct action into it. The locations where each individual can set his baskets are inherited like for a property of land.
