= Registered historic parks and gardens in Newport =

List of buildings in county borough of Wales

Newport shown within Wales

Newport is a city and county borough in the south of Wales. It covers an area of 190 km^{2} (73 sq mi) and in 2021 the population was approximately 159,700.

The Cadw/ICOMOS Register of Parks and Gardens of Special Historic Interest in Wales was established in 2002 and given statutory status in 2022. It is administered by Cadw, the historic environment agency of the Welsh Government. Elisabeth Whittle described Cadw as having a "somewhat special and guiding role" in the preservation of historic parks and gardens, since they are "an integral part of Welsh archaeological and architectural heritage". The register includes just under 400 sites, ranging from gardens of private houses, to cemeteries and public parks. Parks and gardens are listed at one of three grades, matching the grading system used for listed buildings. Grade I is the highest grade, for sites of exceptional interest; Grade II*, the next highest, denotes parks and gardens of great quality; while Grade II denotes sites of special interest.

There are ten registered parks and gardens in Newport. One is listed at Grade II*, and nine are at Grade II.

== Key ==
| Grade | Criteria |
|---|---|
| I | Parks and gardens of exceptional interest |
| II* | Parks and gardens of great quality |
| II | Parks and gardens of special interest |

== List of parks and gardens ==
List of parks and gardens
| Name | Location Grid Ref. (Note: Sometimes known as OSGB36, the grid reference is based on the British national grid reference system used by the Ordnance Survey.) Geo-coordinates | Date Listed | Description / Notes | Grade | Reference Number | Image |
|---|---|---|---|---|---|---|
| Beechwood Park | Beechwood; ST3318588633; 51°35′32″N 2°57′53″W | 1 February 2022 | Country house garden The 30-acre (12 ha) gardens were laid out when the house was built in 1877–78. Both were bought by Newport Borough Council who opened the grounds as a public park in 1900. | II | PGW(Gt)18(NPT) | a grass slope in front of a small mansion |
| Bellevue Park | Stow Hill; ST3058087212; 51°34′44″N 3°00′07″W | 1 February 2022 | Public park Opened in 1894 and designed by T. H. Mawson on land donated by Lord Tredegar. A Gorsedd circle was built for the 1897 Eisteddfod and the two-storey tea pavilion was constructed in 1910. | II | PGW(Gt)19(NPT) | a bandstand and flower beds in a park |
| Bryn Glas | Shaftesbury; ST3104490271; 51°36′24″N 2°59′45″W | 1 February 2022 | Garden The walled kitchen garden lies to the north and the gardens and pleasure grounds lie to the south and east of the nineteenth-century house. The 21-acre (8.4 ha) estate is now surrounded by housing but was originally set in open countryside. | II | PGW(Gt)20(NPT) | Bryn Glas |
| Kemeys House | Langstone; ST3808692663; 51°37′44″N 2°53′41″W | 1 February 2022 | Country house garden The layout of the terraces and garden walls suggests that they are contemporary with the sixteenth-century manor house and its outbuildings. | II | PGW(Gt)50(NPT) | |
| Machen House | Graig; ST2269288190; 51°35′12″N 3°06′58″W | 1 February 2022 | Country house garden The gardens were laid out when the house was built (1831–1835) for Rev. Morgan. | II | PGW(Gt)32(NPT) | Machen House |
| Nos 15 and 17 Stow Park Circle | Gaer; ST2989687434; 51°34′51″N 3°00′43″W | 1 February 2022 | Rock garden The extensive rock and water garden was originally part of the gardens of Stelvio House (demolished 1996). The gardens, which were laid out between 1914 and 1920, were broken up from 1935 onwards. | II | PGW(Gt)58(NPT) | |
| Pencoed Castle | Langstone; ST4058489270; 51°35′55″N 2°51′28″W | 1 February 2022 | Country house garden The remains of the garden terrace and walled enclosures lie to the east and south of the Tudor manor house, which was built on the site of a moated Norman castle. | II | PGW(Gt)3(NPT) | The remains of a large stone gatehouse |
| Plas Machen | Graig; ST2338587565; 51°34′53″N 3°06′21″W | 1 February 2022 | Country house garden The terraced formal garden and fishpond lie to the south-west of the remaining part of a sixteenth-century mansion. | II | PGW(Gt)33(NPT) | a large house surrounded by trees |
| St Woolos Cemetery | Allt-yr-yn; ST2934687579; 51°34′56″N 3°01′11″W | 1 February 2022 | Cemetery The land was purchased from Lord Tredegar in 1854 for what became the first public cemetery in Wales. Structures built within the grounds include the Anglican and Nonconformist chapels (both 1855), a Catholic chapel (c. 1880), and a synagogue. | II | PGW(Gt)38(NPT) | a road through a cemetery, with trees and rows of headstones |
| Tredegar Park | Graig; ST2851786159; 51°34′09″N 3°01′53″W | 1 February 2022 | Park and country house garden The original park has been greatly reduced by urban development and divided by the M4 and other major roads passing through the site. The remaining areas of open parkland lie to the north and north-west of the house which is surrounded by gardens developed mainly in the seventeenth and eighteenth centuries. | II* | PGW(Gt)48(NPT) | An oak tree on the right of the image, in the background is a large red-brick country house |

== See also ==
- List of scheduled monuments in Newport
- Grade I listed buildings in Newport
- Grade II* listed buildings in Newport
