= Grade II* listed buildings in Newport =

Newport shown within Wales

In the United Kingdom, the term listed building refers to a building or other structure officially designated as being of special architectural, historical, or cultural significance; Grade II* structures are those considered to be "particularly important buildings of more than special interest". Listing was begun by a provision in the Town and Country Planning Act 1947. Once listed, strict limitations are imposed on the modifications allowed to a building's structure or fittings. In Wales, the authority for listing under the Planning (Listed Buildings and Conservation Areas) Act 1990 rests with Cadw.

== Buildings ==
Name	Location Grid Ref. (Note: Sometimes known as OSGB36, the grid reference is based on the British national grid reference system used by the Ordnance Survey.) Geo-coordinates	Date Listed	Function	Notes	Reference Number	Image
Pencoed Castle	Langstone; ST4062689401; 51°36′01″N 2°51′31″W	3 March 1952		Located at the end of a narrow lane from by-road off B4245, approx 1km S of Llandevaud village and 1km E of Llanmartin.	2904	See more images
Plas Machen	Graig; ST2346787539; 51°34′53″N 3°06′21″W	3 March 1952		At the end of a track S off the A468, some 900m Se of the church at Lower Machen.	2905	See more images
Church of St Basil	Graig; ST2773587124; 51°34′42″N 3°02′39″W	3 January 1963		On the E side of Bassaleg, on the N side of the churchyard some 75m W of the Ebbw River.	2913	See more images
Kemeys Manor	Langstone; ST3820192597; 51°37′44″N 2°53′39″W	3 January 1963		Set on the E side of the A449. Located on the W slope of the steep escarpment of Kemeys Graig, immediately to the S of the A449. Set at the end of a long private drive overlooking the River Usk on a lane leading from Llantrisant to Langstone.	2916	Upload Photo
Church of St Mary	Llanwern; ST3706287865; 51°35′10″N 2°54′35″W	3 January 1963		Located on the S side of the Lane leading from Llanwern village to Bishton at the junction of the driveway to Barn Farm. Immediately to the N of the Spencer steelworks	2926	See more images
Church of Saint Michael	Graig; ST2279988081; 51°35′11″N 3°06′56″W	3 January 1963		In a prominent position in the centre of Lower Machen Conservation Area.	2927	See more images
Church of St Mary	Marshfield; ST2616682573; 51°32′14″N 3°03′57″W	3 January 1963		Set on the N side of Church Lane opposite Church Farm, leading off Marshfield Road. The church is surrounded by a low rubble wall with cock and hen coping; lych gate to W and remains of medieval cross base to S, now with modern timber cross.	2932	See more images
Church of St Michael	Michaelston-y-Fedw; ST2406684598; 51°33′19″N 3°05′48″W	3 January 1963		Located at the W side of the village, within a C19 walled enclosure, set behind the public house.	2935	See more images
Church of St Bridget	Wentlooge; ST2923682298; 51°32′07″N 3°01′18″W	3 January 1963		Located on the W side of Church Road, opposite Church Farm, set down a small track.	2941	See more images
Church of St Mary	Whitson; ST3807383439; 51°32′47″N 2°53′40″W	3 January 1963		In churchyard reached by drive approximately 300m E of junction with Whitson Common Road. Now redundant.	2943	See more images
Whitson Court	Whitson; ST3711484709; 51°33′28″N 2°54′31″W	3 January 1963		Set back on E side of road 800m S of electricity substation.	2944	See more images
Church of St Cadoc	Caerleon; ST3393990642; 51°36′39″N 2°57′19″W	7 November 1951		In the centre of Caerleon village immediately north of the National Roman Legion Museum.	2948	See more images
The Endowed School	Caerleon; ST3388790583; 51°36′37″N 2°57′22″W	7 November 1951		About 80m south west of the Church of St Cadoc in the centre of Caerleon.	2984	See more images
Tower to the south west of, and attached to, The Hanbury Arms	Caerleon; ST3416590372; 51°36′30″N 2°57′08″W	7 January 1951		Attached to the south west corner of The Hanbury Arms.	2996	Tower to the south west of, and attached to, The Hanbury Arms
Newport Castle	Stow Hill; ST3116288449; 51°35′26″N 2°59′42″W	26 July 1951		Beside River Usk in angle formed by Newport Bridge and Old Green Interchange.	2997	See more images
Penhow Castle	Penhow; ST4236890867; 51°36′49″N 2°50′01″W	3 January 1963		Set high on a hilltop above the Newport to Chepstow road. In its own grounds beyond the Parish Church and reached by drive with relocated stone gatepiers and distinctive ball finials.	3078	See more images
Machen House including attached outbuildings and curved screen wall	Graig; ST2273088077; 51°35′11″N 3°07′00″W	10 April 1990		In the centre of the village immediately to W of the Parish Church. Set in its own landscaped grounds and reached by short drive with gate piers.	3084	See more images
Gatehouse at Pencoed Castle	Langstone; ST4060089456; 51°36′03″N 2°51′32″W	19 December 1995		Located at the front of the castle which is at the end of a narrow lane from by-road off the B4245, approx 1km S of Llandevaud village and 1km E of Llanmartin.	17076	Gatehouse at Pencoed Castle
Edney Gates at Tredegar House	Coedkernew; ST2878285285; 51°33′43″N 3°01′44″W	3 January 1963		Middle Court is located immediately to the northwest of Tredegar House separating it from the Stable Court, the Edney Gates and screen are set at the north end dividing the house and Stable Court.	17097	Edney Gates at Tredegar House
Boundary walls to Orangery and Cedar gardens at Tredegar House	Coedkernew; ST2870485208; 51°33′41″N 3°01′48″W	3 January 1963		Set immediately to the west of Tredegar House and the Orangery, enclosing the Cedar Garden and the Orangery Garden. Set of brick piers set at the north end of the Orangery Garden, the south of the Cedar Garden and a central pair linking the two garden courtyard	17098	Boundary walls to Orangery and Cedar gardens at Tredegar House
Newport Civic Centre	Allt yr yn ST3043888224; 51°35′19″N 3°00′20″W	14 September 1999		Occupies a large prominent site S of Fields Road, bounded by Godfrey Road (E), Faulkner Road (S), and Clytha Park Road to the W.	22333	See more images
George Street Bridge	Victoria, Newport; ST3191687734; 51°35′04″N 2°59′03″W	31 October 2001		Spans River Usk between Corporation Road and Dock Street.	25847	See more images
Railway viaduct over Ebbw River	Bassaleg; ST2782187203; 51°34′45″N 3°02′35″W	23 July 2003		Crossing the Ebbw River from E to W on the NE side of Bassaleg.	81343	See more images

== See also ==
- Listed buildings in Wales
- Grade II* listed buildings in Monmouthshire
- Grade II* listed buildings in Cardiff
- Grade II* listed buildings in Caerphilly
- Grade II* listed buildings in Torfaen
- Grade I listed buildings in Newport
- List of Scheduled Monuments in Newport
- Registered historic parks and gardens in Newport
