= McCarthy Stone =

UK retirement community developer and manager

McCarthy & Stone Limited
- Trade name: McCarthy Stone
- Formerly: McCarthy & Stone (1977–2008); McCarthy & Stone Limited (2009–2015); McCarthy & Stone plc (2015–2021)
- Industry: Real estate
- Founded: 1977
- Headquarters: Bournemouth, England, United Kingdom
- Key people: Paul Lester (Chairman); Matthew Pratt (CEO)
- Revenue: £725.0 million (2019)
- Operating income: £48.4 million (2019)
- Net income: £34.9 million (2019)
- Number of employees: 2,433 (2019)
- Parent: Lone Star Funds
- Website: mccarthyandstone.co.uk

McCarthy Stone is a developer and manager of retirement communities in the United Kingdom.

== History ==
John McCarthy and Bill Stone became partners in 1961, and in 1977 they built their first retirement housing development in Hampshire. Subsequently, they ceased other building work to concentrate on developing specialist housing for elderly people. The company quickly became the largest developer and manager of retirement communities for private ownership in the UK. By 1982, when the company was floated on the Unlisted Securities Market, the company had completed 15 retirement housing developments and was selling around 200 units per year. Growth was rapid after the flotation, and by 1984 the company operated on a national basis with annual sales approaching 1,000 units. The business was exceptionally profitable around this time due to a rapidly ageing population. Annual sales reached 2,601 units in 1988.

During late 1990, a pre-tax loss of £10.8 million was recorded, resulting in interim dividend payments being reduced. In early 1991, John Gray was appointed as the joint managing director of McCarthy and Stone while John McCarthy retained the chairmanship; several other senior management changes were made around this time. In June of that year, in response to sustained losses and the desire to increase its construction activity and minimise borrowing, the company launched a rights issue aimed at securing £13.3 million. Losses continued to be recorded throughout the early 1990s recession. In 1998 the company was fined £200,000 with £13,000 costs for demolishing Stelvio House, Newport, South Wales. Demolition took place one day after the building had been spot-listed by Cadw, the Welsh historic environment agency, in recognition of its architectural and historic importance. The fine was the largest recorded by the Institute of Historic Building Conservation, reflecting what the judge in the case described as a "cynical commercial act".

By early 1994, it had become clear that McCarthy Stone was heading towards recovery; several of its domestic competitors, in comparison, had gone out of business during the economic downturn. During the mid 1990s, the firm was reportedly the only large player left in the sheltered housing market. Amid a wider economic recovery, the company's sales figures sharply increased during the late 1990s and early 2000s.

In January 2001, the firm's founders sold £8 million worth of stock in McCarthy Stone. During the early 2000s, it took preparatory measures for an economic downturn. In late 2001, the company decided to cease its design-and-build activities as a cost-cutting measure. In 2005, McCarthy & Stone sold 12 of its investment property interests to Owners Provident in exchange for £25 million.

During mid 2006, a bidding war broke out over the ownership of McCarthy Stone. Later that year, following the completion of a takeover bid of over £1 billion from a consortium including David and Simon Reuben and Sir Tom Hunter, the company was de-listed from the London Stock Exchange and became privately owned. At the time, it was the biggest takeover deal of a British housebuilder in history.

In May 2008, the company opted to postpone the start of new construction projects due to a credit crunch. During February 2009, amid the economic effects of the Great Recession, McCarthy Stone was reportedly facing administration as its lenders publicly disagreed on how to address the firm's debt burden of £900m. A debt-for-equity swap was performed later that year, which reduced Lloyds Bank's stake in the firm to 25 per cent.

At one point, McCarthy Stone was reportedly planning to undertake an IPO during 2012, but this did not take place. One year later, the company underwent refinancing and restructuring shortly after the appointment of new leadership. During November 2015, the firm was re-listed on the London Stock Exchange. By late 2016, trade was reportedly growing steadily for the firm. In 2018, McCarthy & Stone's boss announced his departure amid a drop in profits.

During 2020, the business was negatively impacted by the COVID-19 pandemic, which not only delayed building projects but drastically diminished sales for that year. In late 2020, the directors accepted a takeover bid from American investment firm Lone Star Funds. Shareholders approved the takeover offer worth £647m.

In April 2021, the company announced a new investment partnership with Macquarie Group and John Laing Group to finance its new rental portfolio.

The company is the only British developer, of any size or type, to win the full five-star rating in the Home Builders Federation's customer satisfaction awards every year the survey has been run.

== Services ==
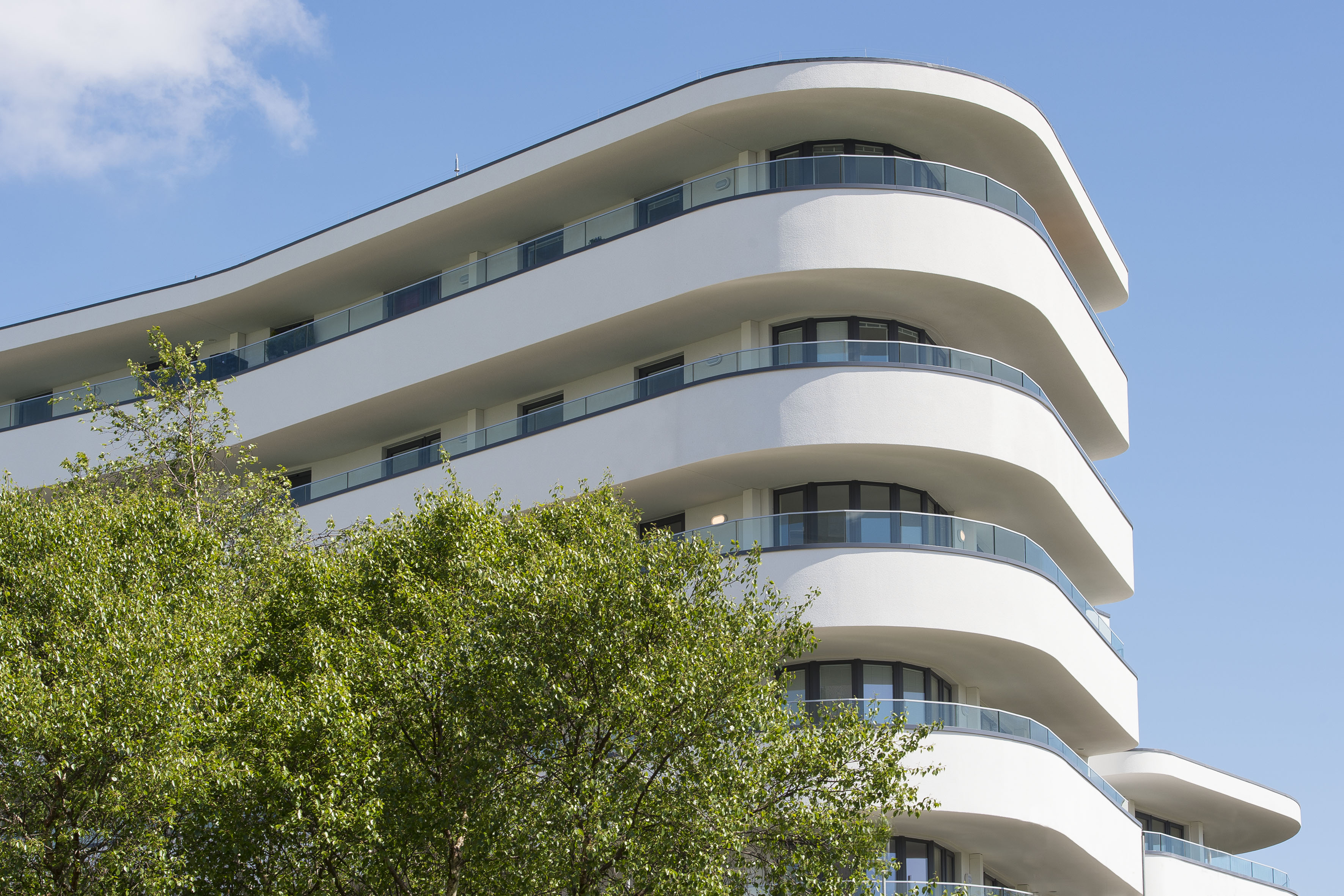
The company's development in Poole, Dorset

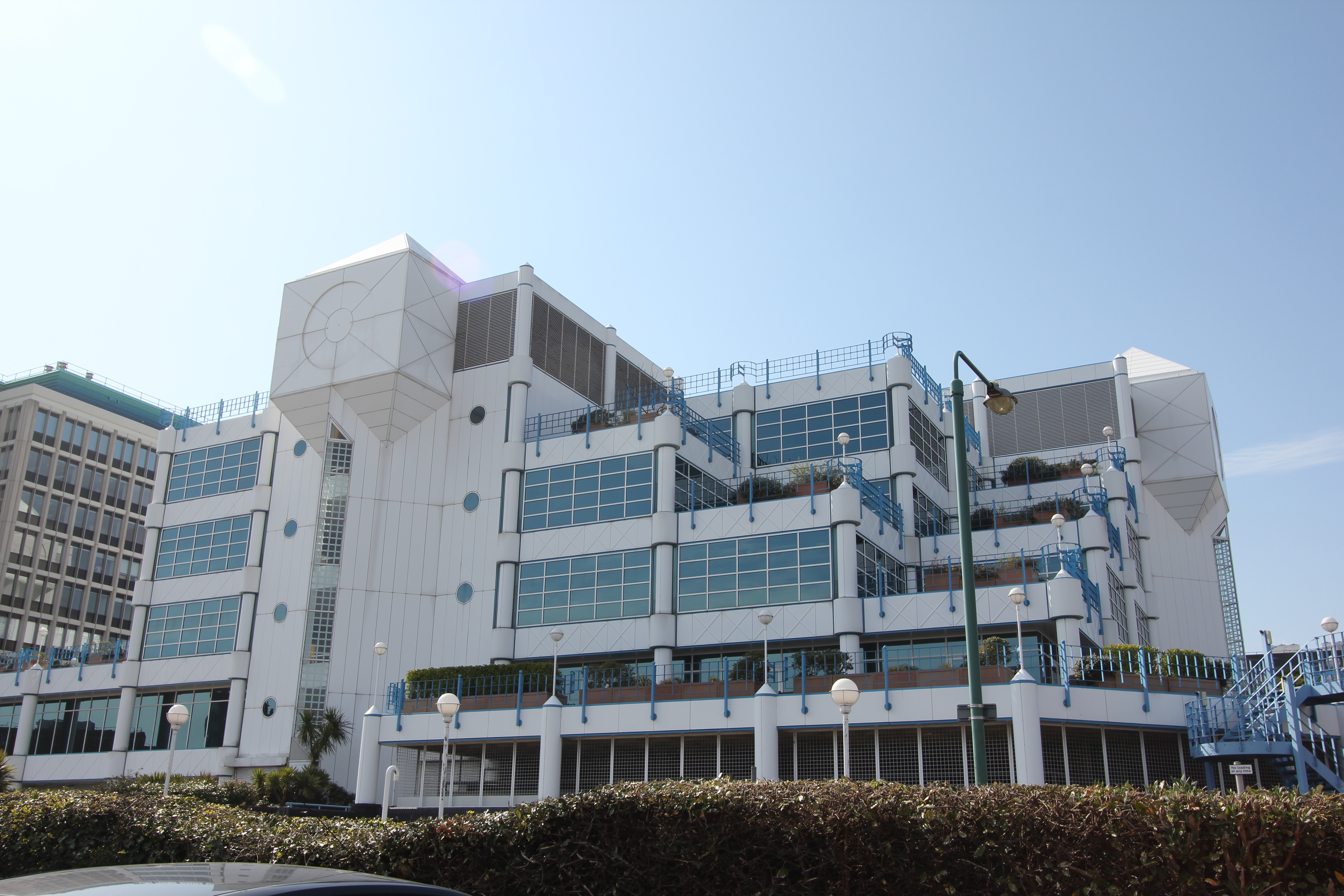
The company's head office, Bournemouth

The company's in-house Services teams operate its Retirement Living and Retirement Living PLUS (Extra Care) schemes built since 2008. In its Retirement Living PLUS schemes, services include the provision of CQC-regulated care and support. It is the largest provider of new Extra Care developments in the UK.

It remains as the landlord and managing agent on all developments opened since 2008, and hence is legally responsible for the operation of these schemes.

As of 2018, the company provides a choice of tenure including rental and affordable and private shared ownership, as well as an expanded care offering.

It began providing Homes England's Older People's Shared Ownership in 2021, to increase the provision of affordable housing for older people.

It is one of the few developers to use modern methods of construction on its construction sites, through its partnership with Remagin.

== Awards ==
Year	Award
2023	Property Developer of the Year
2022	Great Place to Work Wellbeing List 2022
2021	Customer Satisfaction Five Star Award
2020	Housing with Care Award
2019	Housing for Older People Awards
2019	NHBC Health and Safety Awards
2019	Customer Satisfaction Five Star Award
2018	Housebuilder Awards
2018	ARMA ACE Awards
2018	NHBC Health & Safety Awards
2024	Best Retirement Developer or Construction Company, and Outstanding Retirement Housing Scheme of the Year

== Charity initiatives ==
In 2017, the company raised over £250,000 for the Royal Voluntary Service. The company's charity partner for 2019 was Beanstalk, a national learning and literacy charity for young children. The company has also supported several smaller charities.

In 2020, it established the McCarthy Stone Charitable Foundation, which raised £230,000 in its first year.
