= Ty-Hwnt-y-Bwlch Farmhouse, Cwmyoy =

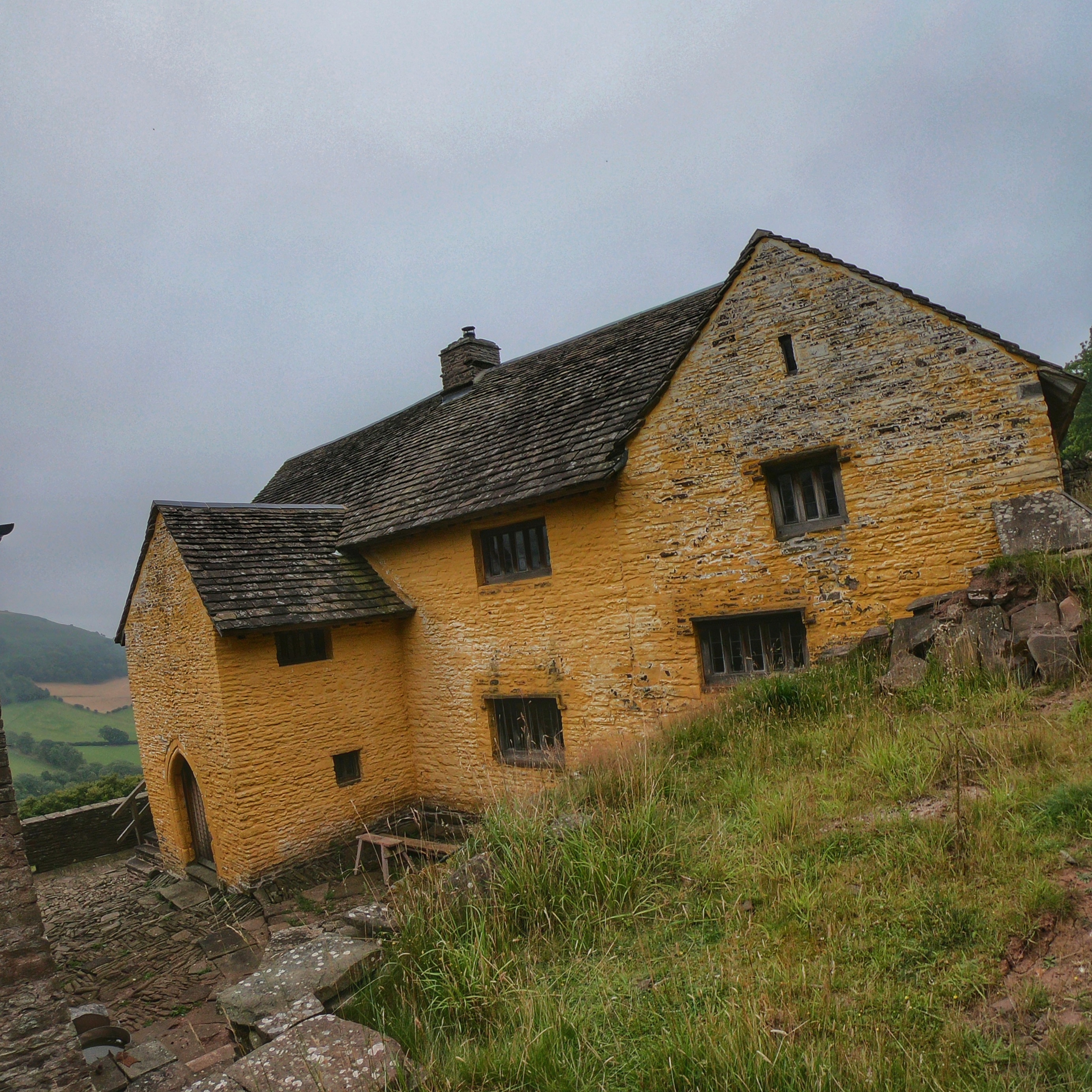
- "a hillside which one would think too steep to make a practical site for building" - John Newman

- Location within Monmouthshire
- 51.9097°N 3.0149°W
- Location: Cwmyoy, Monmouthshire

History
- Built: late 16th century

Site notes
- Architectural style: Vernacular
- Governing body: Privately owned

Listed Building – Grade II*
- Official name: Ty-Hwnt-y-Bwlch Farmhouse
- Designated: 20 December 1994
- Reference no.: 15659

Listed Building – Grade II
- Official name: Barn at Ty-Hwnt-y-Bwlch Farm
- Designated: 20 December 1994
- Reference no.: 15658

Listed Building – Grade II
- Official name: Stables at Ty-Hwnt-y-Bwlch Farm
- Designated: 20 December 1994
- Reference no.: 15660

Ty-Hwnt-y-Bwlch Farmhouse, (Welsh: translation - The house near the pass), Cwmyoy, Monmouthshire is a farmhouse in the north of the county dating from the late 16th century. Located on the hillside above the Church of St Martin, it is a Grade II* listed building.

== History ==
The architectural historian John Newman calls Ty-Hwnt-y-Bwlch "a lonely farmstead" and describes its site as "a hillside which one would think too steep to make a practical site for building". The farmhouse dates from the late 16th century, with additions in the 17th century and is of a Welsh longhouse plan. Cadw records that it is reputed to include elements taken from Llanthony Priory including the arch to the porch. At the time of the Cadw surveys in the late 20th century, the building was "in poor condition" but renovation has subsequently been undertaken.

== Architecture and description ==
Ty-Hwnt-y-Bwlch is constructed in stone to a L-plan and is "exceptionally unaltered". The interior has an elaborate doorcase, carved with "stags, hounds, harps and leaves". The Royal Commission on the Ancient and Historical Monuments of Wales notes the presence of a medieval arch. The house is listed Grade II*. The barn, dating from the 1720s, and stables, which date from the 19th century, have their own Grade II listings. The courtyard wall to the north of the farmhouse incorporates a set of bee boles.

== Gallery ==
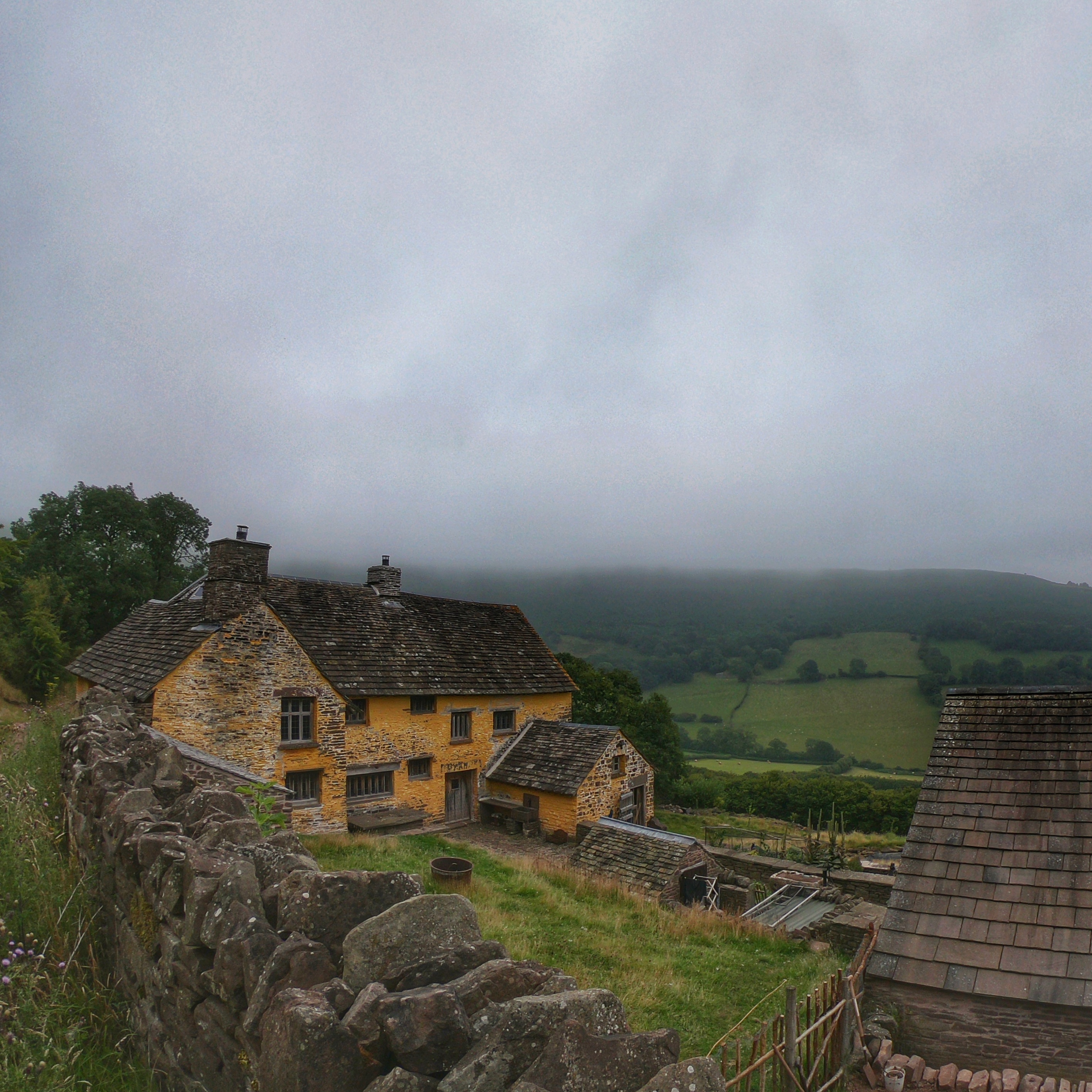
A rear view of the farmhouse

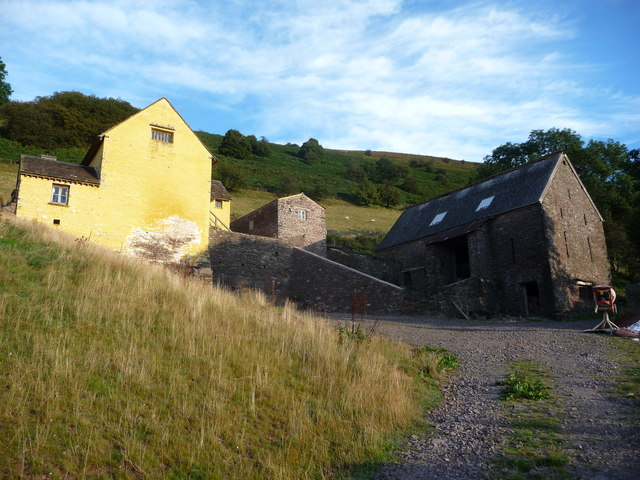
The farmhouse and ancillary buildings
