= Wallpaper History Society =

British heritage organisation

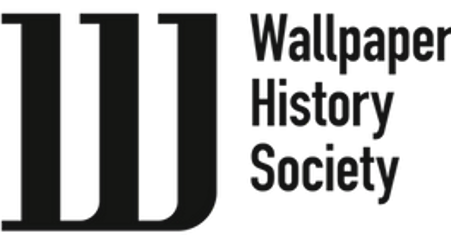
Wallpaper History Society

The Wallpaper History Society (WHS) is a British charity and membership organisation devoted to research on the subject of wallpaper.

== Background ==
The WHS was established in 1986 by a group of curators and conservators at the Victoria and Albert Museum and The Whitworth art gallery. Among the founders were Christine Woods, curator of wallpaper at The Whitworth, and Treve Rosoman of English Heritage.

The WHS expanded to include national and international designers, manufacturers, decorators, and wallpaper enthusiasts. In 2010 the Society became a charity with the aim of encouraging further interest and supporting research into the subject of wallpapers and wallcoverings through visits to places of interest, publications, and conferences. To fulfil these aims the WHS runs events including: visits to museums, archives, artists' studios, and wallpaper factories; lectures; symposia; trips; and webinars.

== Publications ==
The WHS produces a biennial journal titled The Wallpaper History Review. The Review contains information regarding wallpaper and wallcoverings from both public and private collections, as well as essays and articles on historic and contemporary wallpapers, and book and exhibition reviews. Contributors include academics, museum professionals, architects, members of the wallpaper trade, artists, printmakers, students, and Society members.

== Grants ==
The WHS offers a bursary of up to £1,500 each year to support historical research and/or developments in the conservation of wallcoverings. The prize is offered in memory of Merryl Huxtable, a founding member of the WHS and notable figure in the field of wallpaper conservation. Previous bursary holders include Corinne Hoge (2025), Louise Atkinson (2024), and Rachael Thomas on behalf of Auchindrain Township (2021).

== See also ==
- Printing Historical Society
- Twentieth Century Society
- The Victorian Society
- Institute of Conservation
- Institute of Historic Building Conservation
- Society of Architectural Historians of Great Britain
- William Morris Society
- Victoria and Albert Museum
- The Whitworth
