= Grade I listed buildings in Newport =

Newport shown within Wales

In the United Kingdom, the term listed building refers to a building or other structure officially designated as being of special architectural, historical, or cultural significance; Grade I structures are those considered to be "buildings of exceptional interest". Listing was begun by a provision in the Town and Country Planning Act 1947. Once listed, strict limitations are imposed on the modifications allowed to a building's structure or fittings. In Wales, the authority for listing under the Planning (Listed Buildings and Conservation Areas) Act 1990 rests with Cadw.

== Buildings ==
Name	Location Grid Ref. (Note: Sometimes known as OSGB36, the grid reference is based on the British national grid reference system used by the Ordnance Survey.) Geo-coordinates	Date Listed	Function	Notes	Reference Number	Image
Tredegar House	Coedkernew; ST2882485244; 51°33′42″N 3°01′41″W	3 March 1952	Country House	Country House set in a landscaped parkland setting on the South side of the M4 at Tredegar.	2902	See more images
Stable Block, Tredegar House	Coedkernew; ST2872285297; 51°33′43″N 3°01′47″W	1 March 1963	Stables	Located to the NW of Tredegar House, facing onto the cobbled Stable Court, and enclosed to the rear by the Stable Yard.	2910	See more images
Church of St Mary, Nash	Nash; ST3430683661; 51°32′53″N 2°56′56″W	1 March 1963	Church	In large churchyard in centre of Nash village.	2936	See more images
St Peter's Church, Wentlooge	Wentlooge; ST2679780139; 51°30′56″N 3°03′23″W	1 March 1963	Church	Located at the centre of Peterstone village, set back from the road, opposite the Six Bells Public House.	2938	See more images
Church of St Thomas, Redwick	Redwick; ST4121484131; 51°33′11″N 2°50′57″W	1 March 1963	Church	At village centre, opposite village hall and Rose Inn.	2940	See more images
St Woolos' Cathedral	Stow Hill; ST3090787603; 51°34′59″N 2°59′55″W	26 July 1951	Cathedral church	At top of Stow Hill; in churchyard bounded by Stow Hill and Clifton Road.	2998	See more images
Newport Transporter Bridge including E and W anchor chambers	Pillgwenlly; Lliswerry; Nash; ST3179486207; 51°34′14″N 2°59′08″W	2 May 1980	Transporter Bridge	Spans River Usk between Stephenson Street and Brunel Street. Additional reference numbers: 17414, 17415	3076	See more images

== See also ==
- Listed buildings in Wales
- Grade I listed buildings in Monmouthshire
- Grade I listed buildings in Cardiff
- Grade I listed buildings in Caerphilly
- Grade I listed buildings in Torfaen
- Grade II* listed buildings in Newport
- Scheduled Monuments in Newport
- Registered historic parks and gardens in Newport
