= Newport Castle =

Castle in Newport, south-east Wales

- Castell Casnewydd (Welsh)
- Newport, Wales
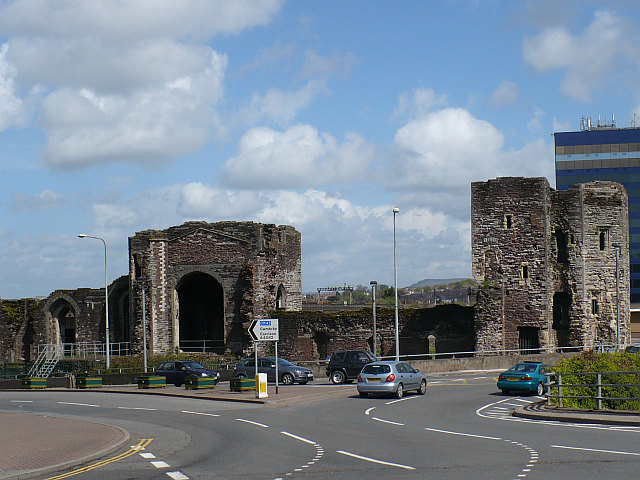

Site information
- Type: Castle
- Condition: Ruins

Location
- Shown within Wales
- Location within Wales
- Coordinates: 51.5906°N 2.9950°W

Site history
- Built: 14th century
- Battles/wars: Sacked by Owain Glyndŵr

Listed Building – Grade II*
- Official name: Newport Castle
- Designated: 26 July 1951; 75 years ago
- Reference no.: 2997

Newport Castle (Welsh: Castell Casnewydd) is a ruined castle in Newport, Wales. It was built in the 14th century, probably by Hugh de Audley, 1st Earl of Gloucester or his son-in-law, Ralph, Earl of Stafford, with the purpose of managing the crossing of the River Usk. The castle was used as administrative offices for the collection of rent and dues from local tenants, and was also a residence and a garrison. In 1402 it was sacked by Owain Glyndŵr. It was in disrepair by 1522, and was taken by Oliver Cromwell's forces during the Civil War. Its use declined further in later centuries. It has been a Grade II* Listed building since 1951.

== Location ==
The castle is in the city of Newport between the Newport Bridge and the neighbouring railway bridge, on the west bank of the River Usk. It is adjacent to the B4591 (A4042), at the Old Green interchange.

== Description ==
The castle was built of Old Red Sandstone and local grey limestone. Originally, it was surrounded by a moat, within a "rectangular walled court". Trett said that "in its heyday it would have dominated the town and the river crossing." It had three tall towers, a large rectangular central tower and two two-storey polygonal end towers, which connected by straight walls. Its form is based upon the line of the river bank on which it is located. A vaulted audience chamber sat above a watergate — "a fortified gate... for use of people and supplies arriving by boat". Above the watergate were turrets.

Within the castle were a great hall, kitchen, a gallery, chambers and, after the 15th century works by Humphrey Stafford, "a series of luxurious" apartments, those used by the lord being in the south tower. Architectural historian John Newman states that the most remarkable feature is the T-shaped room in the central tower above the watergate, which "must have provided a remarkable ceremonial setting."

Images of the castle are found in a town map of 1750. A plan of the castle itself was published in Archaeologia Cambrensis in 1885. Newman has a detailed description of the architecture, and a plan.

The castle site included land between Newport Station and the river. Construction projects, including a railway, railway bridge and a later inner ring road, resulted in modifications to the site, including destruction of "most of the inner bailey" and the removal of the moat. The courtyard no longer remains, and at its height, the castle was a "river oriented" castle with no special fortification on the roadside portion of the walled court. Now, only the east side of the castle remains.

== History ==
=== The first castle ===
The first castle at "Castell Newyd ar Uysc" (New Castle on the River Usk) was a Norman motte possibly built by William Rufus around 1075. Its exact location is uncertain, but a common theory is that it was built at Stow Hill close to St Woolos Church, about 0.5 miles (0.80 km) southwest of the later castle.

In 1910, James Matthews, author of Historic Newport, wrote that the first mention of a castle in Newport was in 1126. William, Earl of Gloucester had a garrison established at the castle in 1171, but the following year the castle was destroyed by Iorwerth. According to Trett, "It is recorded in the Welsh Brut y Tywysogion that in about 1172 King Henry II visited Castell Newyd ar Uysc (New Castle on the River Usk). In 1185 the king’s accounts show that six pounds fourteen shillings and sixpence were spent on repairs to the castle of Novi Burgi (i.e. Newport) and its buildings and bridge." The castle was restored in 1249 by Henry III, and it was held in 1265 by the Earl of Leicester. That same year, Prince Edward occupied the castle, and in 1295, when he was the king, he ordered improvements and repairs. It was ceded to Hugh Despenser the Elder, 1st Earl of Winchester in 1320 and two years later Roger Mortimer, 1st Earl of March attacked the castle, took its furnishings and set it on fire. Three hundred trees were needed for reconstruction.

The scanty remains of the Norman castle were probably buried by spoil from a railway tunnel dug in 1846.

=== 14th and 15th centuries ===
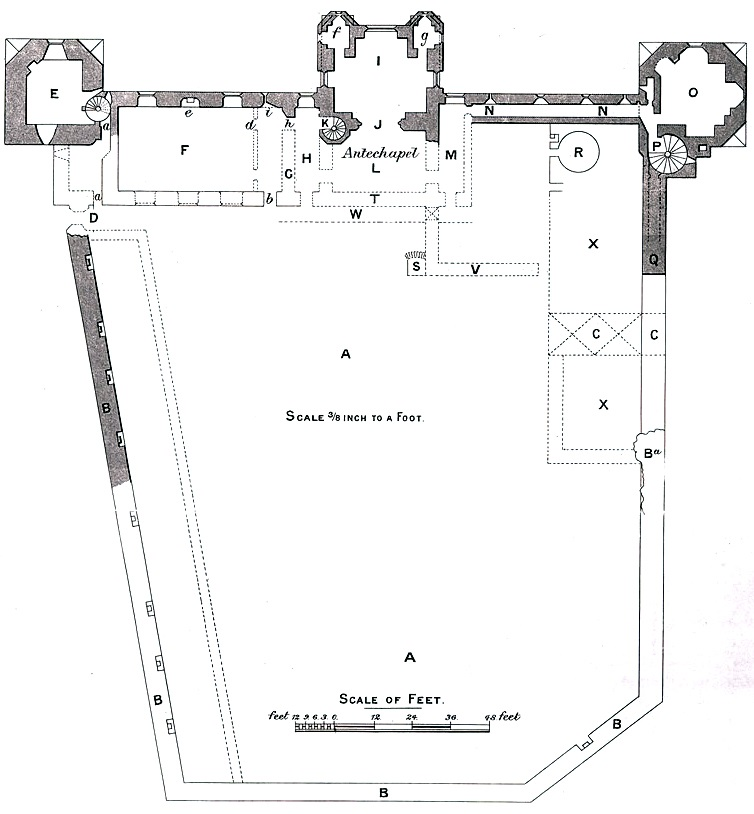
Ground plan of Newport Castle, showing the portions surviving in 1858. From Archaeologia Cambrensis, 1885

The second castle at Newport, commonly known as Newport Castle, was built in the 14th century, possibly by Hugh de Audley, 1st Earl of Gloucester, (Note: Newman stated that Newport Castle was built following Gilbert de Clare's death when his sister Margaret's husband, Hugh de Audley was made Lord of Gwynllwg.) after de Audley took control of Despenser's lands in 1326, or, more probably, by his son-in-law and successor Ralph, Earl of Stafford. (Note: There is evidence that there was an earlier structure on the site from the previous century which may go back to the 10th century.) Historians, such as Jeremy Knight, believe it was built between 1327 and 1386. A coin made during Edward III's reign (1327-1377) was found during an 1845 excavation of the site. It had an "imposing position" above the river and controlled the river crossing and trade upstream. At that time Newport became the centre of the lordship of Wentlooge.

The castle was first documented in 1405, when it was repaired after being sacked in 1402 in the rebellion by Owain Glyndŵr. Around 1435 further work was undertaken by Humphrey Stafford, Lord of Newport. Owen Tudor was held prisoner within the castle in 1460. It was primarily the lordship's administrative centre, an adjunct to their main estate for collecting local tenants' dues and rent. It was rarely used as the lord's residence.

=== 16th to 19th centuries ===
It was occupied in the early 16th century by Henry VIII's uncle, Jasper Tudor. Seized by Henry VIII in 1521, the castle was held by the king until 1547 when it was then possessed by Edward VI. It had suffered from lack of upkeep from 1522, at which date it was already reported to be in disrepair. William Herbert of St. Julian leased the castle starting in 1548.

In 1645, during the Civil War, Colonel Henry Herbert established a garrison of 50 troops at the castle, which was taken by Oliver Cromwell's forces in 1648. The Herbert and Morgan families held it over a 300-year period that began in 1548. It was in a state of ruin by 1743.

In the 19th century, the buildings within the ruin were used as a tannery and later as a brewery. The hall's traceried windows were destroyed in that century, and the brewery was destroyed by a fire in 1883. In 1891, the south tower came into the ownership of the Corporation, and the rest of the castle was bought by Lord Tredegar in 1899. The Office of Works became the guardian of the castle between 1930 and 1950, at which time there was a refurbishment of the stonework.

=== 20th and 21st centuries ===
The east side is the only part of the castle to survive. It has been a Grade II* Listed building since 1951. An inner ring road was built alongside the castle in 1970. The ruins of the castle were permanently fenced off in 2003, followed by the closure of the public footpath in 2006. It has been closed since 2011, due to safety concerns.

== In popular culture ==
Days That Have Been
Can I forget the sweet days that have been,
When poetry first began to warm my blood;
When from the hills of Gwent I saw the earth
Burned into two by Severn's silver flood:

When I would go alone at night to see
The moonlight, like a big white butterfly,
Dreaming on that old castle near Caerleon,
While at its side the Usk went softly by:

— from Songs Of Joy and Others (1911)

In about 1796 J. M. W. Turner made a "picturesque, romantic" painting of the ruin, as did other artists.

The castle was the inspiration for the 1911 poem "Days That Have Been" by Newport-born W. H. Davies.

== Gallery ==
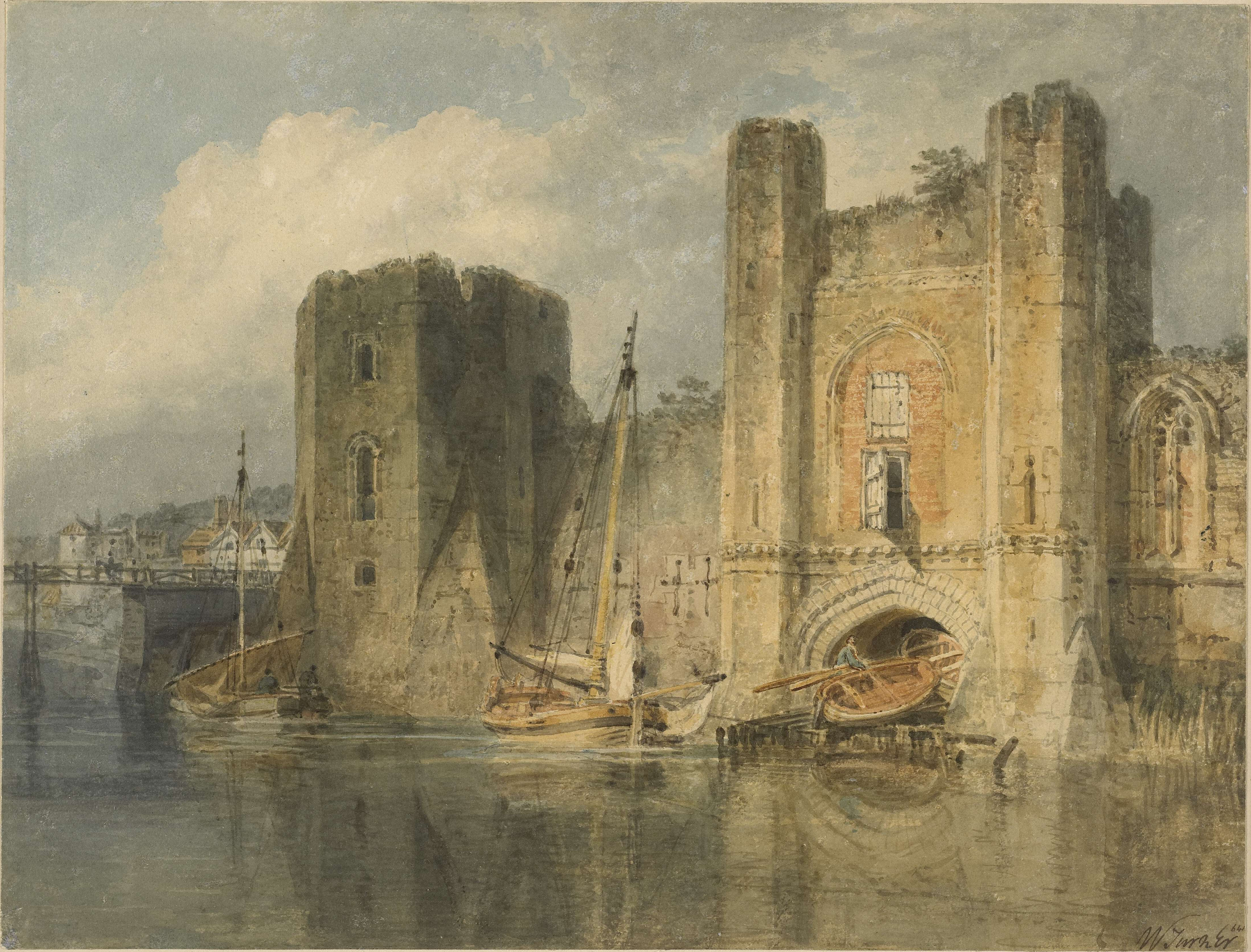
Newport Castle by J. M. W. Turner, c.1796, watercolour and graphite on paper

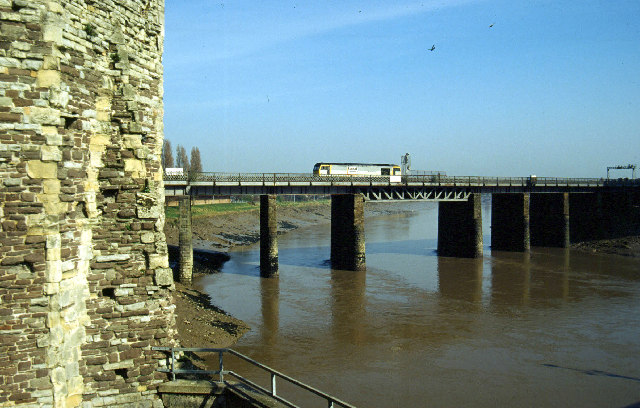
Trains pass near to the castle on the railway bridge crossing the River Usk

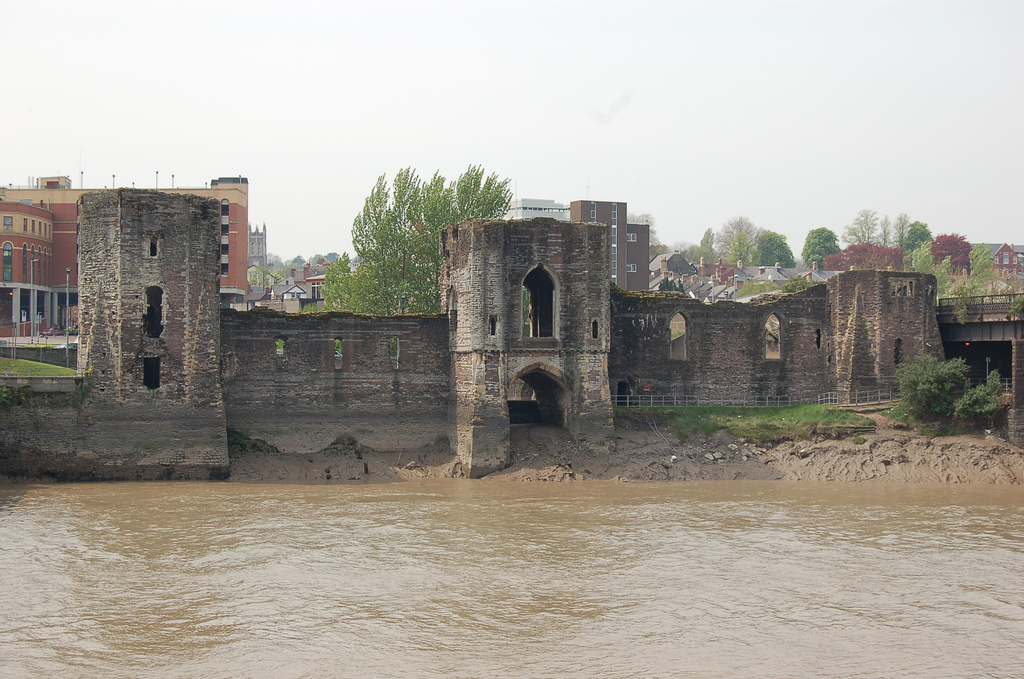
Newport Castle from the east bank. Note the watergate in the centre tower

== See also ==
- Grade II* listed buildings in Newport
- List of Scheduled Monuments in Newport
