= Stelvio House, Newport =

Stelvio House (15 and 17 Stow Park Circle)
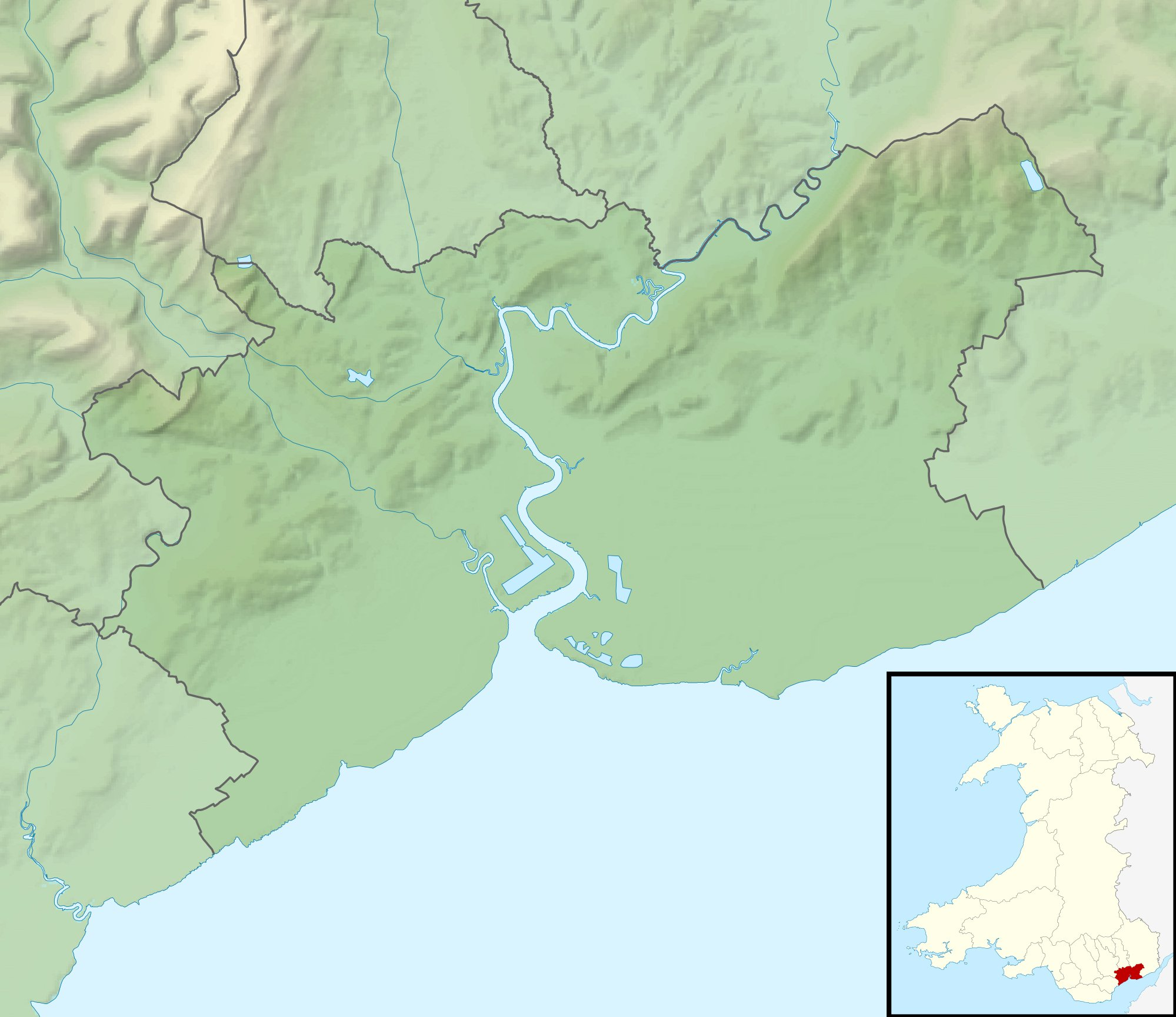
- Location within Newport
- 51.5813°N 3.0111°W
- Type: House (demolished) and gardens
- Location: Stow Hill, Newport, Wales

History
- Built: House late 19th and early 20th centuries, gardens early 20th century

Cadw/ICOMOS Register of Parks and Gardens of Special Historic Interest in Wales
- Official name: Nos 15 and 17 Stow Park Circle
- Designated: 1 February 2022
- Reference no.: PGW(Gt)58(NPT)

Stelvio House on Bassaleg Road, Newport, Wales was the home of Charles Henry Bailey, a 19th century industrialist. Bailey, an engineer by training, owned the Tyne Engine Works at Newport and also published a number of almanacs mainly related to shipping matters; including C. H. Bailey's Book of translations: 5,200 marine technical terms in English, German, French, Italian, Spanish & Norwegian, C. H. Bailey's Tables of Distances from Port to Port and C. H. Bailey's Book of Useful Information.

Stelvio House, in the Stow Park area of the city, then and now its most prosperous area, was built in two phases in 1893 and in 1912. Bailey died in 1907, but his widow continued development of the house and laid out the gardens between 1914 and 1920.

Stelvio House was spot-listed on 20 March 1996 by Cadw in recognition of its architectural and historic importance. The developers, and site owners, McCarthy & Stone almost immediately demolished part of the house in what a judge called a "cynical commercial act". They were later fined £200,000, at the time, the largest fine recorded by the Institute of Historic Building Conservation.

== 15 and 17 Stow Park Circle ==
The large formal gardens which originally surrounded Stelvio House were mainly constructed in Pulhamite, an artificial rock. They included a fishpond, an outdoor swimming pool and a free-standing grotto. (Note: In 2013, the part of the site containing the outdoor swimming pool was put up for sale.) The rock and water gardens, which became the gardens of 15 and 17 Stow Park Circle, are listed at Grade II on the Cadw/ICOMOS Register of Parks and Gardens of Special Historic Interest in Wales.
