= Grade I listed buildings in Torfaen =

Torfaen shown within Wales

In the United Kingdom, the term listed building refers to a building or other structure officially designated as being of special architectural, historical, or cultural significance; Grade I structures are those considered to be "buildings of exceptional interest". Listing was begun by a provision in the Town and Country Planning Act 1947. Once listed, strict limitations are imposed on the modifications allowed to a building's structure or fittings. In Wales, the authority for listing under the Planning (Listed Buildings and Conservation Areas) Act 1990 rests with Cadw.

== Buildings ==
Name	Location Grid Ref. (Note: Sometimes known as OSGB36, the grid reference is based on the British national grid reference system used by the Ordnance Survey.) Geo-coordinates	Date Listed	Function	Notes	Reference Number	Image
Balance tower, Blaenavon Ironworks	Blaenavon; SO2499709295; 51°46′38″N 3°05′19″W	9 February 1995	Lift	At N end of site. Hydraulic lift to raise iron and raw materials in trams.	15292	See more images
Blast furnaces, Blaenavon Ironworks	Blaenavon; SO2492809282; 51°46′38″N 3°05′22″W	9 February 1995	Blast furnace	Three extant furnaces and the remains of others, stand in a row on the north-west side of the furnace yard, behind the cast houses.	15294	See more images
Cast house and foundry, Blaenavon Ironworks	Blaenavon; SO2493409265; 51°46′37″N 3°05′22″W	9 February 1995	Foundry	To NW of site. The extant cast house to furnace No 1.	15296	See more images

== See also ==
- Listed buildings in Wales
- Grade I listed buildings in Monmouthshire
- Grade I listed buildings in Newport
- Grade I listed buildings in Caerphilly County Borough
- Grade II* listed buildings in Blaenau Gwent – there are currently no Grade I listed buildings in Blaenau Gwent
- Grade II* listed buildings in Torfaen
- Scheduled Monuments in Torfaen
