= Lower Machen =

Lower Machen: Welsh: Machen Isaf
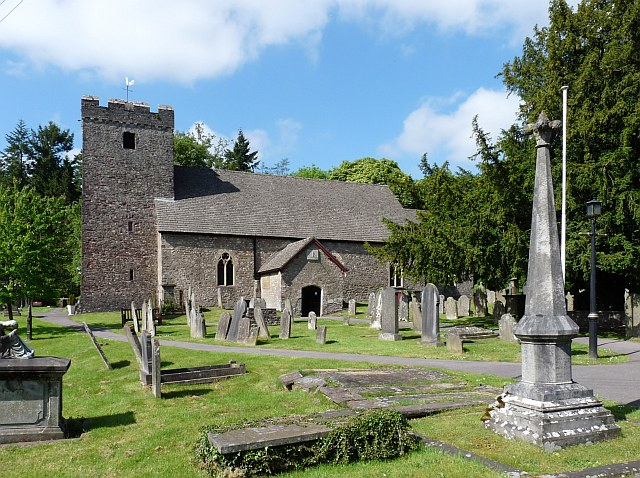
- St Michael and All Angels' Church

- Location within Newport
- OS grid reference: ST215895
- Principal area: Newport
- Preserved county: Gwent
- Country: Wales
- Sovereign state: United Kingdom
- Post town: NEWPORT
- Postcode district: NP10
- Dialling code: 01633
- Police: Gwent
- Fire: South Wales
- Ambulance: Welsh
- UK Parliament: Newport West
- Senedd Cymru – Welsh Parliament: Caerphilly

Lower Machen (Welsh: Machen Isaf) is a small hamlet at the very western edge of the city of Newport, South Wales. It is adjacent to the A468 road, south-east of Machen in the county borough of Caerphilly. Both settlements lie within the historic boundaries of Monmouthshire.

Lower Machen holds an annual festival of chamber music concerts in the 12th-century church of St. Michael and All Angels. Ruperra Castle is also located in Lower Machen. Lower Machen was formerly served by Church Road railway station, which closed in 1957. The Conservative politician Peter Thorneycroft lived at Machen House during his time as Member of Parliament for Monmouth from 1945 to 1966. Plas Machen, to the south-east of the village on the other side of the A468, is an Elizabethan manor house, the ancestral home of the Morgans of Tredegar. It is a Grade II* listed building.

== St Michael and All Angels' Church ==
It is believed that the church (51.5863°N 3.1157°W) was founded during the Celtic period in the 6th century. The current building dates back to the 12th century. The church has connections with the Morgans of Tredegar; 14 members of the family are buried in the grounds. (Note: From the nineteenth century, the Morgans were instead buried at the nearby Church of St Basil, Bassaleg.) There are eleven hatchments connected with the family and the Morgan Family Chapel contains monuments to the family. Three of the hatchments appeared in BBC One's Antiques Roadshow broadcast on 23 November 2014 and were valued at around £3,000 each.

The church has eight bells, which are rung at festivals and weddings.
