= St Martin's Church, Cwmyoy =

Coordinates: 51.9043°N 3.0202°W

Church of St Martin, Cwmyoy
- Church of St Martin
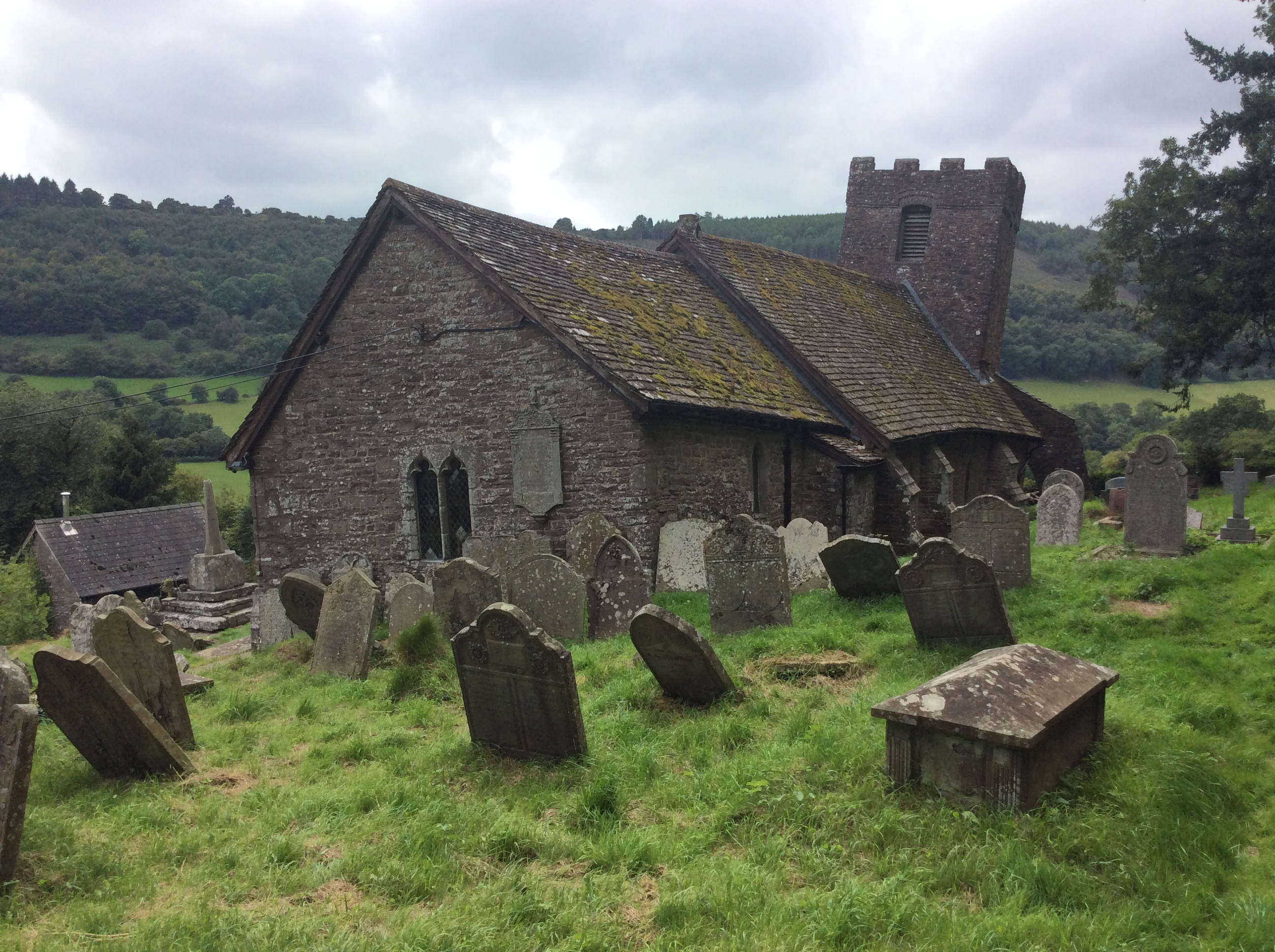
- "The most crooked church in Britain"

- Location in Monmouthshire
- OS grid reference: SO299233
- Location: Cwmyoy, Monmouthshire
- Country: Wales
- Denomination: Church in Wales

History
- Status: Parish church
- Founded: c.12th century
- Dedication: St Martin

Architecture
- Functional status: Active
- Heritage designation: Grade I
- Designated: 9 January 1956
- Architectural type: Church

Administration
- Diocese: Monmouth
- Archdeaconry: Monmouth
- Deanery: Abergavenny
- Parish: Llanfihangel Crucorney with Oldcastle and Cwmyoy and Llanthony

Clergy
- Vicar: Rev D J Young

The Church of St Martin, Cwmyoy, Monmouthshire, Wales, was begun in the 12th century, although most of the current structure dates from the 13th century. The church is most notable for its extreme tilt, the result of a landslide. This has led to many attempts to strengthen the church and prevent its collapse, through the use of massive tie beams and buttresses. The church is in the Gothic style, and has a chancel, nave, south porch, and western tower. A round-headed north window dates to the 12th century, and the nave roof has been dated to the late 13th or early 14th century. St Martin's is a Grade I listed building and an active parish church. It is dedicated to St Martin of Tours.

== History ==
The church is difficult to date but the North-West window in the nave is the oldest feature, from the 12th century. The underlying geology is of Old Red Sandstone overlying marl, and processes of slippage and subsidence over the centuries have caused the tower and chancel to move in opposite directions, twisting the entire structure. The initial landslips must have occurred soon after the original construction as the medieval fabric of the church shows evidence of repairs and rebuilding in attempts to address the instability of the site. The tower is medieval but cannot be dated with certainty. A Victorian restoration by J. James Spencer in 1887 added buttresses to the nave and chancel and flying buttresses to the tower. These efforts sought to stabilise the church rather than to "set (it) straight". Further renovations took place in 1991. St Martin's is known as "the crooked church" due to the extreme nature of its non-alignment and has been called "the most crooked in Britain". The church is an active church in the parish of Llanvihangel Crucorney with Oldcastle and Cwmyoy and Llanthony.

== Architecture and description ==
The church is constructed of Old Red Sandstone rubble with stone-tiled roofs. The architectural style is Gothic and the building comprises a nave, chancel, porch and a three-storeyed tower with a castellated parapet. The interior is slightly less altered than the exterior, the nave roof dating from the late 13th or early 14th centuries. The unevenness of the structure remains very evident, however, the writer Simon Jenkins noting, "visitors might be on the deck of a galleon in a storm, with the chancel about to slide overboard". The Monmouthshire writer and artist Fred Hando describes the church chancel as an example of a "weeping chancel", where the non-alignment of the nave and chancel axes was deliberate and was intended to represent the body of Christ in death, the nave standing for the body and the chancel standing for the head, fallen to the right. The rood screen is a "remarkable work of craftsmanship". The church's windows are 16th-century and the communion rails date to the 17th century. A number of 18th- and 19th-century funeral monuments within the church were constructed by three generations of the Brute family of the distant village of Llanbedr, near Crickhowell, Powys.

The tower contains a set of six bells dating from 1672, 1697, 1700, 1700, 1722 and 1722. Cadw notes that a set of this age with such contiguous dates is "a rarity". However, the bells cannot be rung in the proper manner, as one or more of the bells are cracked or broken and the tower has been deemed incapable of supporting the forces generated by change ringing.

The church is a Grade I listed building, its listing noting its "interesting history, distinctive historic character and fine fittings".

== Cwmyoy Cross ==
In the nave of the church stands a stone cross, sometimes referred to as a wayside cross or crucifix, dated to the 11th or 12th century. In the Middle Ages the cross, which bears a rare carving of Christ on the cross, would have stood in the churchyard to be venerated by pilgrims travelling through the Black Mountains, via Llanthony Abbey, to St David's Cathedral in Pembrokeshire.

At the Reformation the cross was buried in the churchyard for safety, although Henry VIII's soldiers never came to the church. In 1967 the cross was stolen but was eventually located in a London antique shop after being recognised by the Keeper of Sculpture at the British Museum. It was returned to the church, although without its stepped base, and is now set into a square-shaped stone which bears an inscription.

The cross is described by the eminent Monmouthshire antiquarian J. M. Lewis in his 2000 article "The Cwmyoy Crucifix" for The Monmouthshire Antiquary.

== Parish ==
St. Martin's Church is part of the amalgamated Benefice of Llantilio Pertholey. It is still an active church, and a regular service of Holy Communion is held each Sunday at 9.30am.

== Churchyard ==
The preaching cross is a scheduled ancient monument. Amongst the gravestones, a modern example consisting of a roughly hewn purple slate pillar close to the north-west corner of the church is notable. It marks the resting place of the racing driver Arthur Denys Gill (1926–2008), who farmed nearby after retirement from the sport.

== Gallery ==
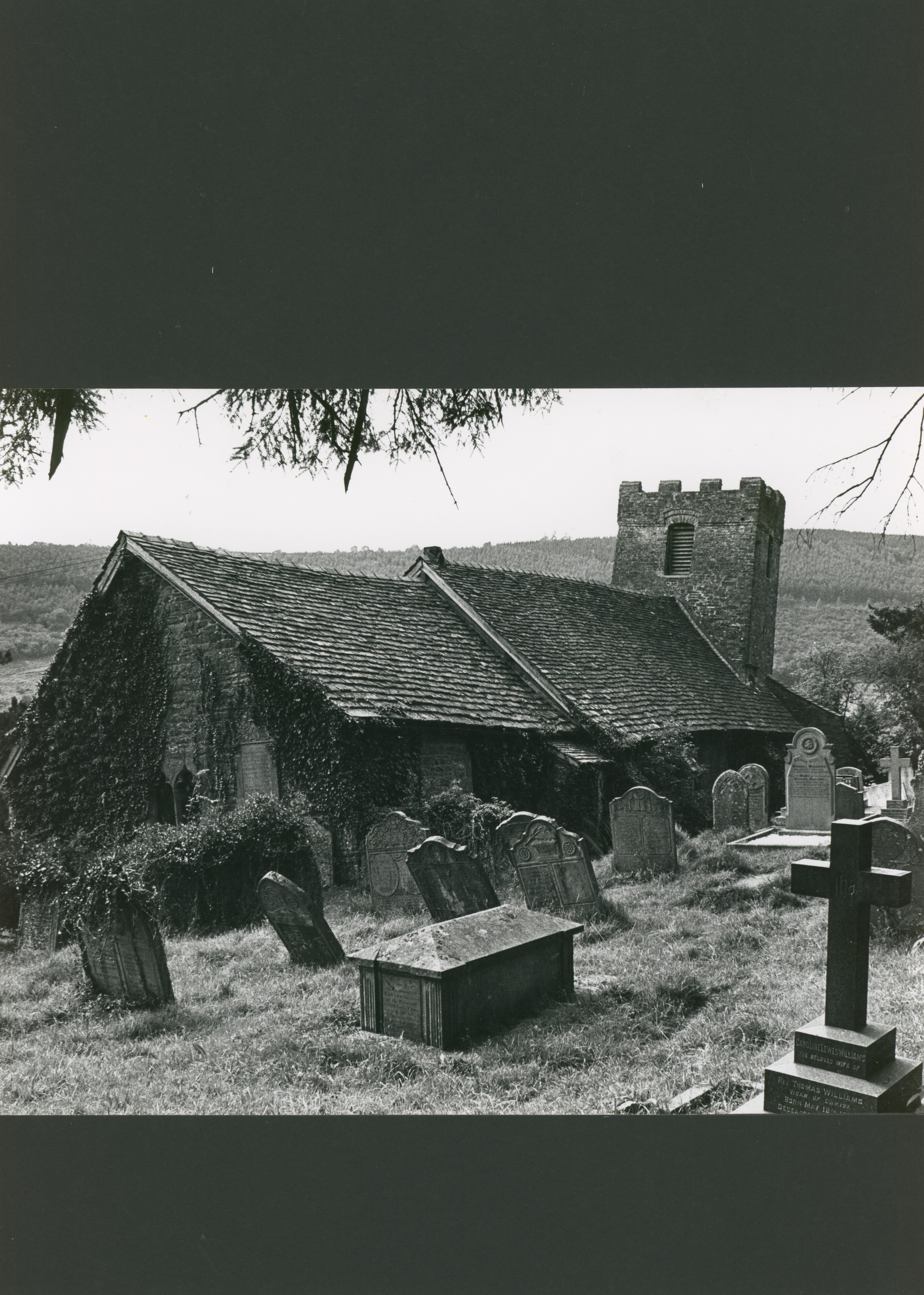
The church in 1978

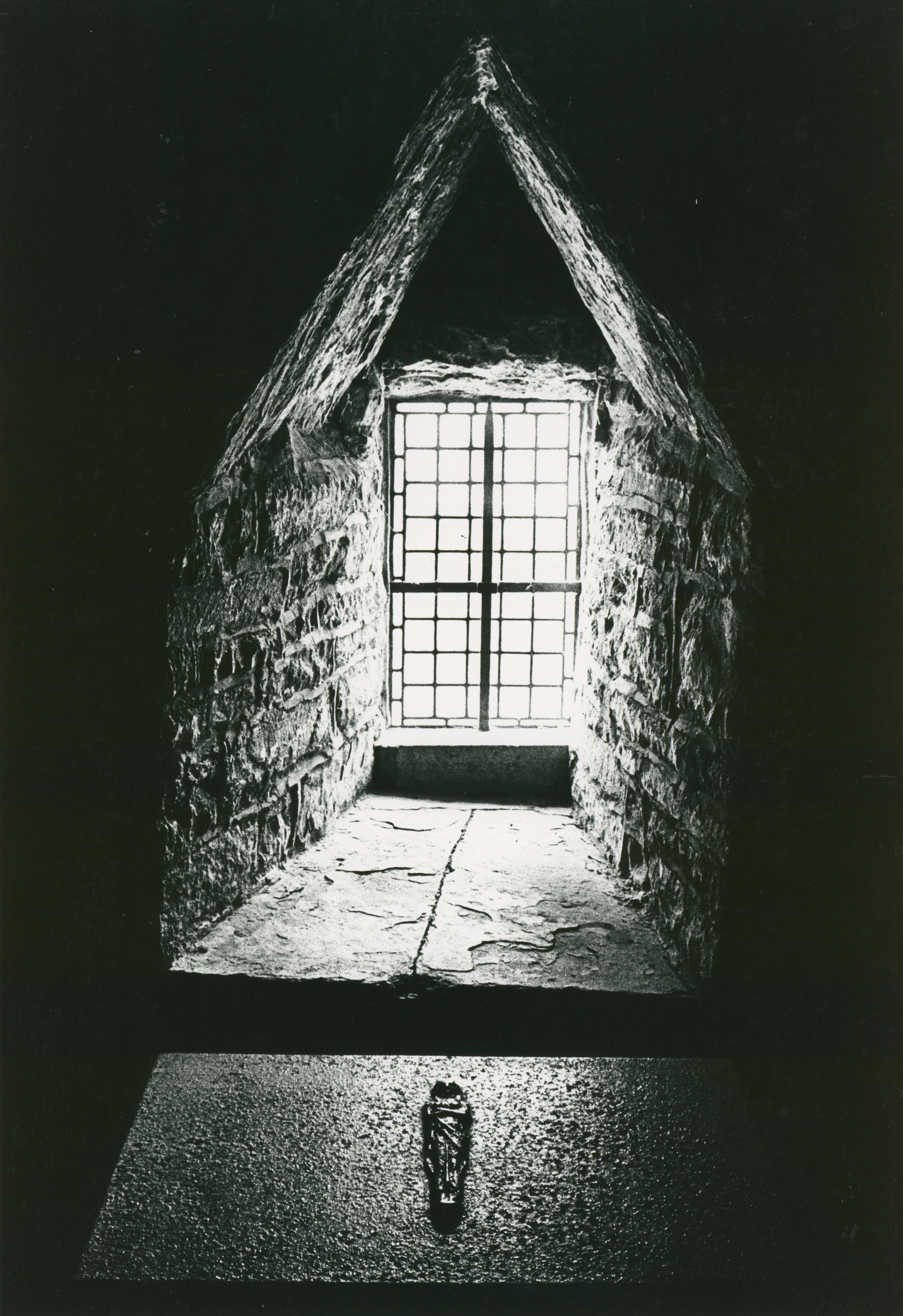
Bell tower window

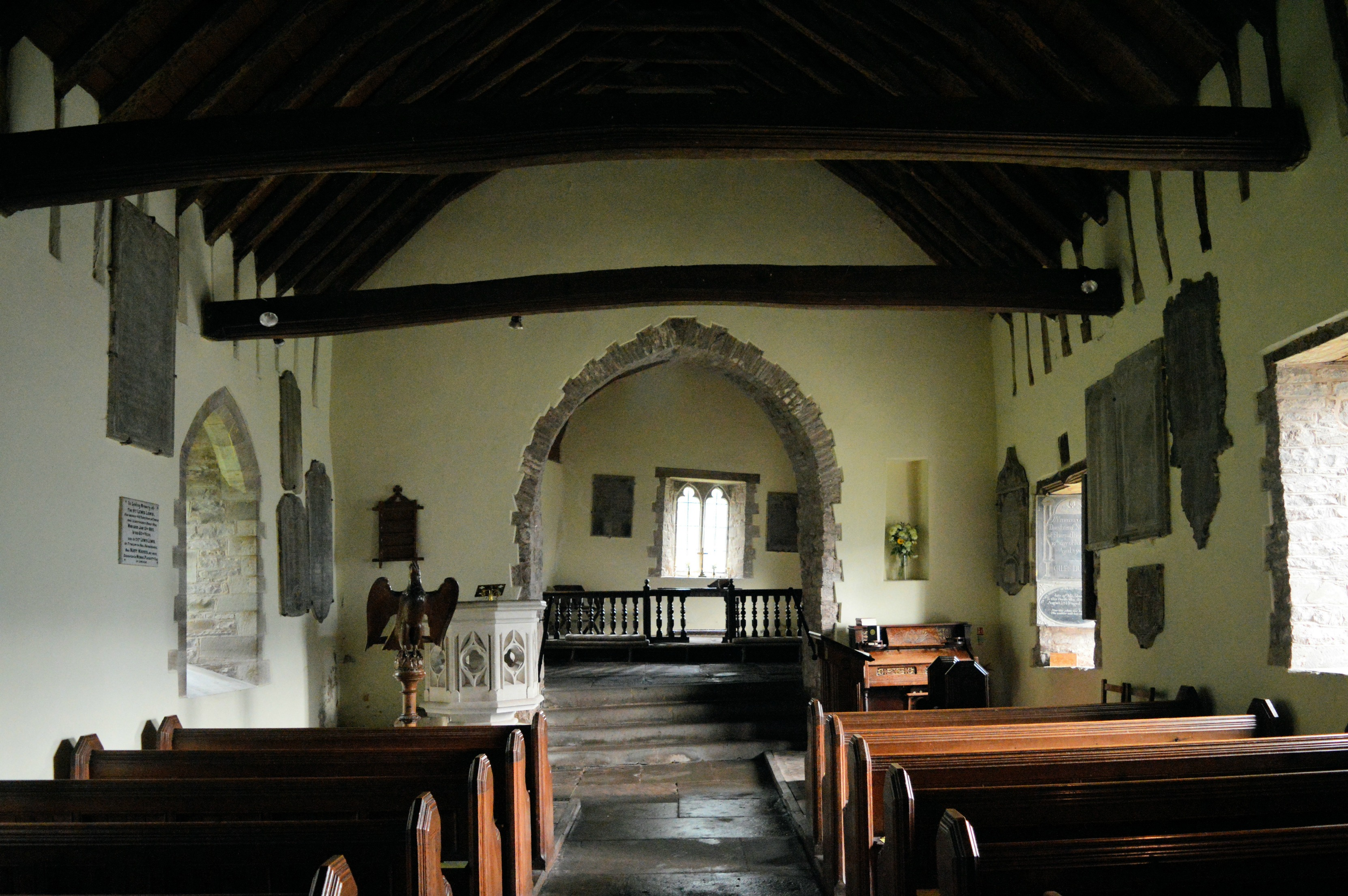
Interior

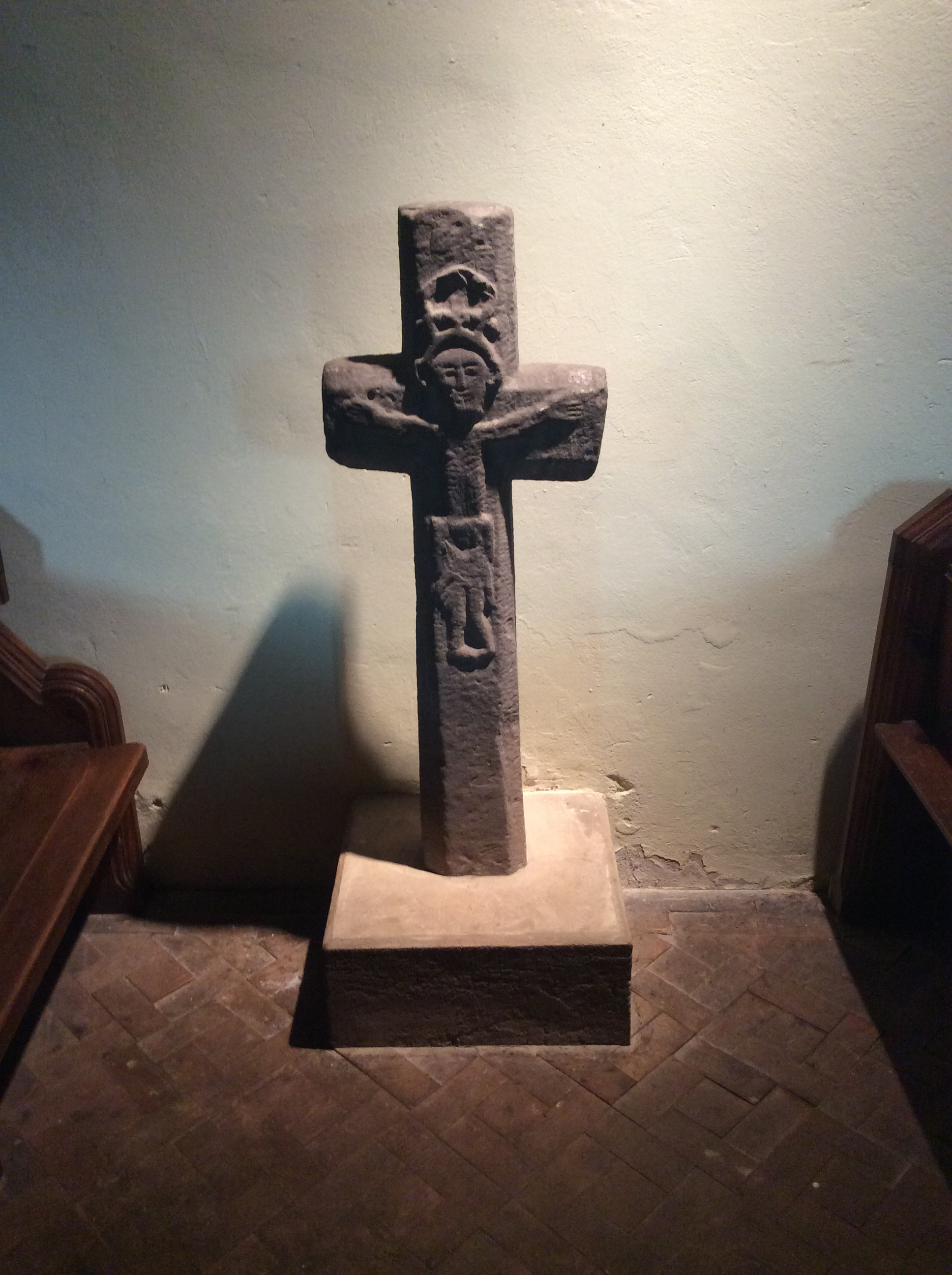
The Cwmyoy Christ

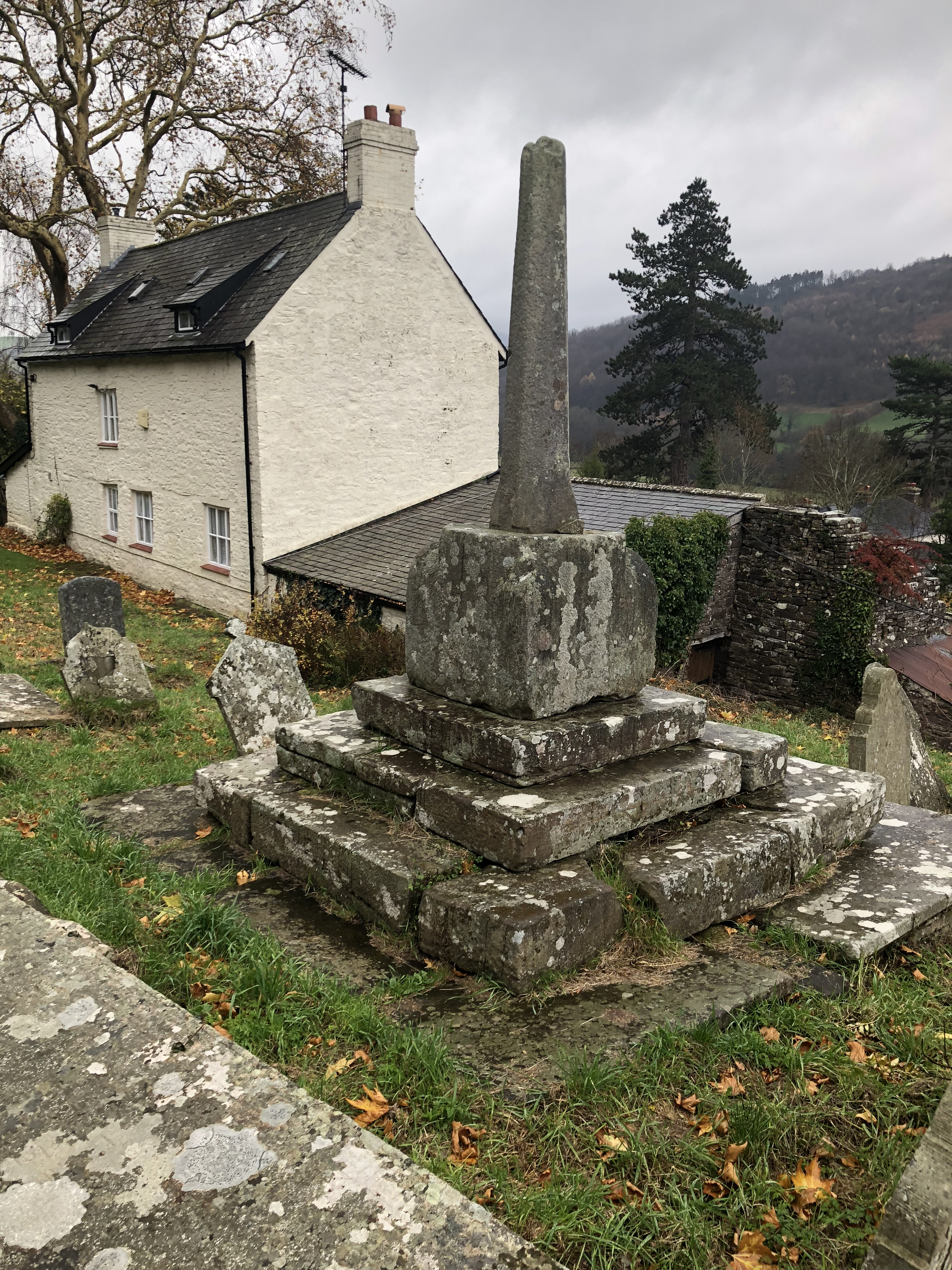
Preaching cross

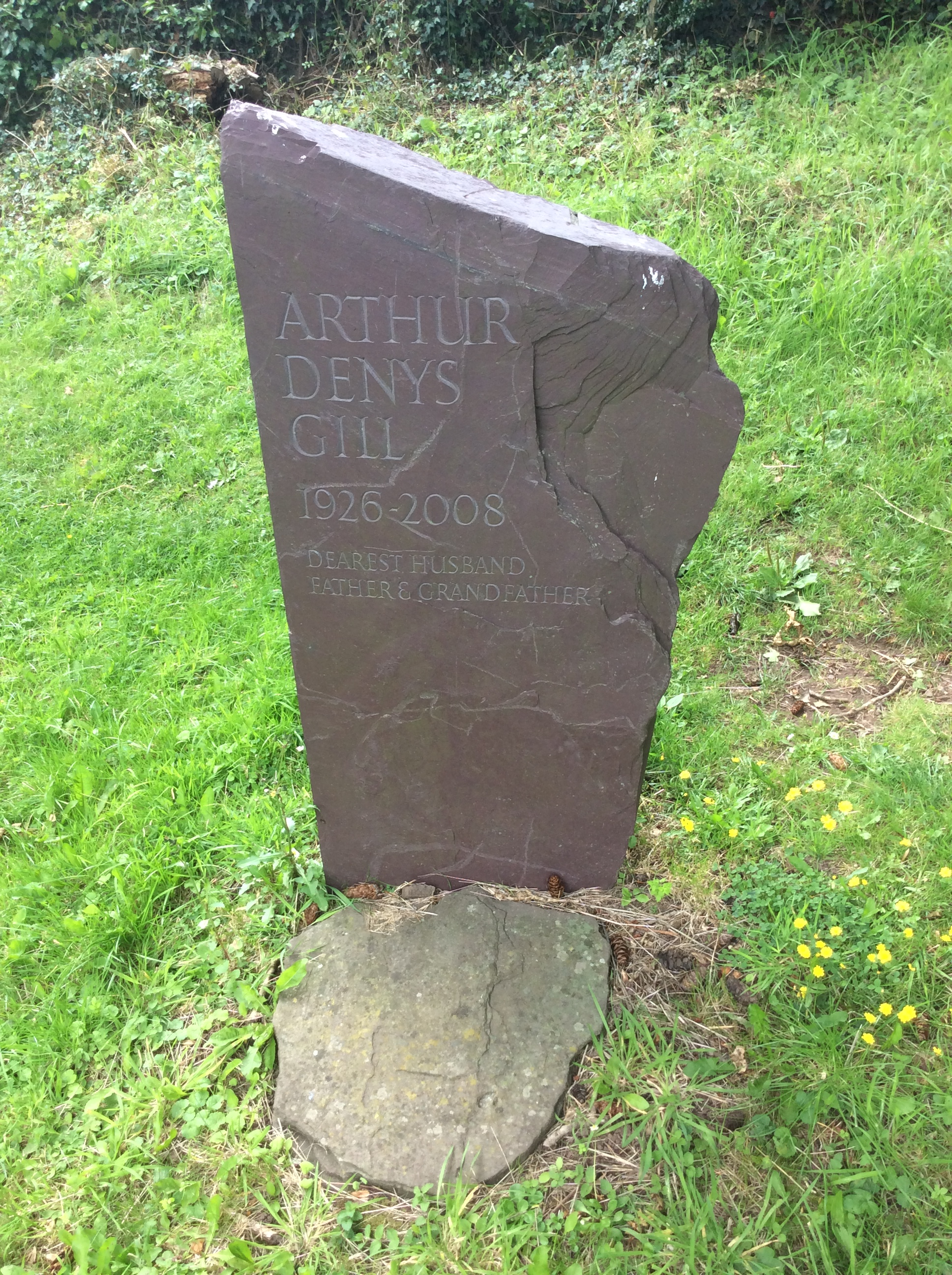
Grave of racing driver Arthur Gill

== Sources ==
- Hando, Fred (1958). Wales: Out and About in Monmouthshire. Newport: R. H. Johns Ltd. OCLC 30235598.
- Jenkins, Simon (2008). Wales: Churches, Houses, Castles. London: Penguin. ISBN 978-0-713-99893-1.
- Newman, John (2000). Gwent/Monmouthshire. The Buildings of Wales. London: Penguin. ISBN 0-14-071053-1.
