= Machen House =

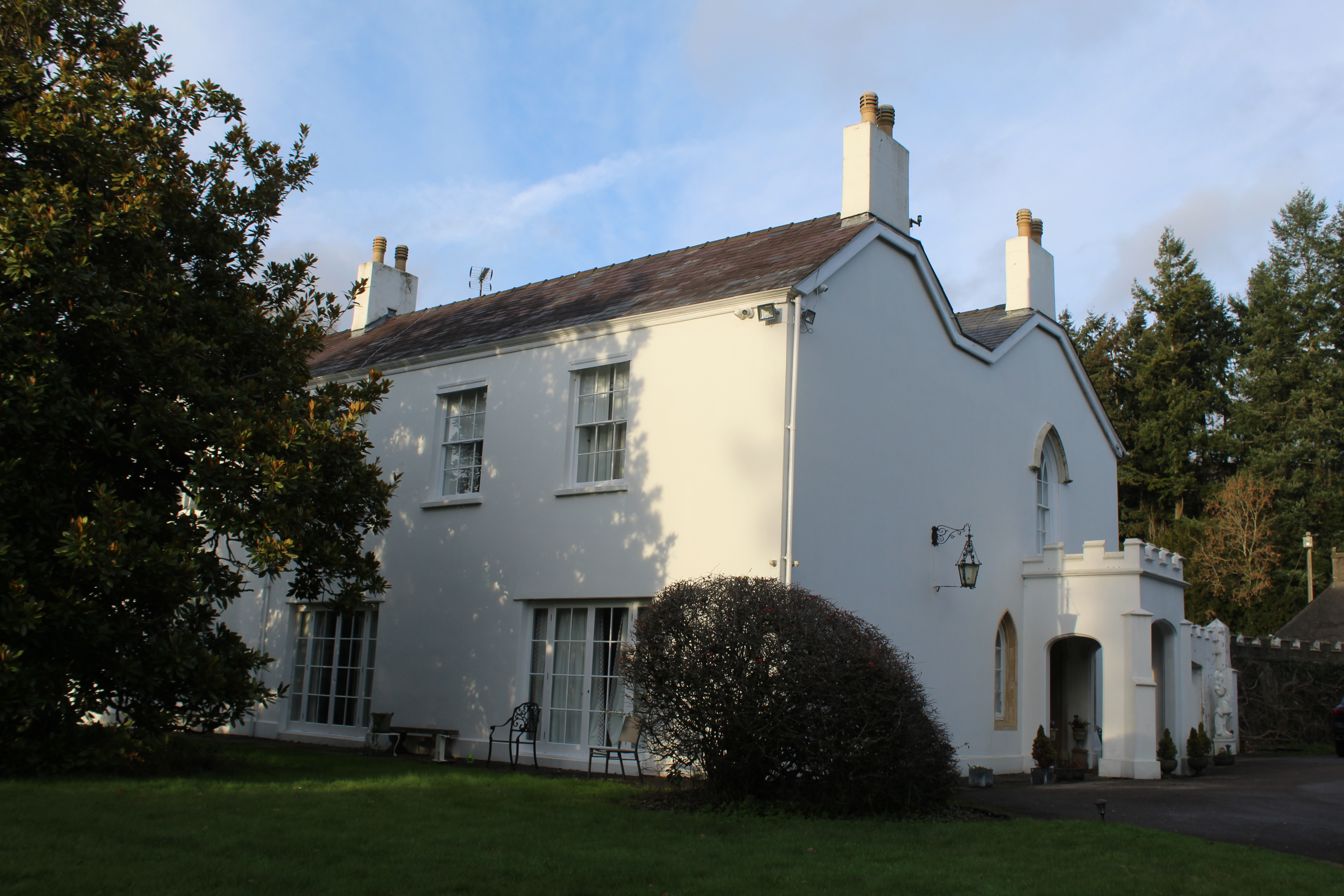
- Machen House in 2025

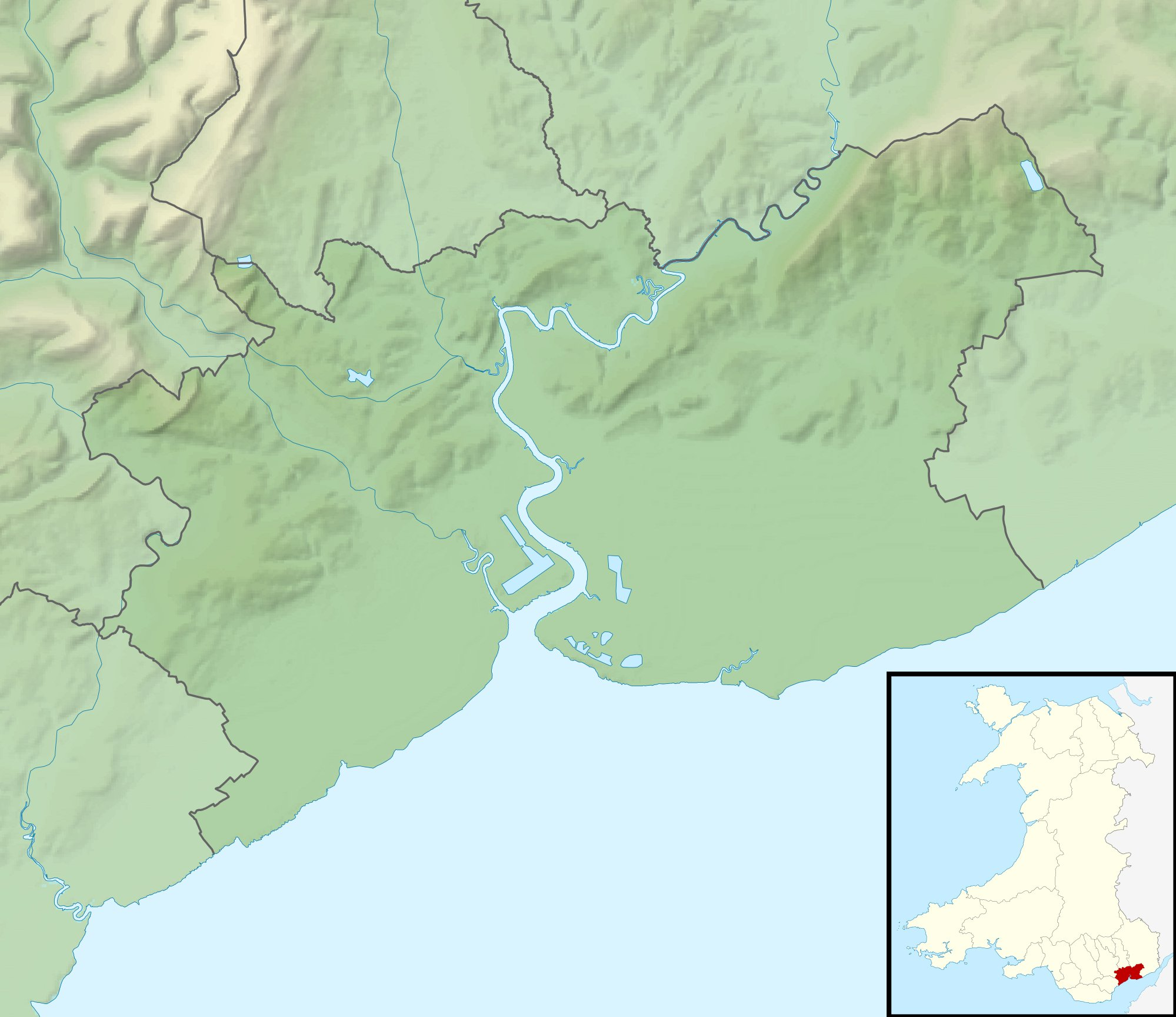
- Location within Newport
- 51.5862°N 3.1167°W
- Type: House
- Location: Lower Machen, Newport, Wales

History
- Built: 1831

Site notes
- Architectural style: Georgian
- Governing body: Privately owned

Listed Building – Grade II*
- Official name: Machen House
- Designated: 4 October 1990
- Reference no.: 3084

Cadw/ICOMOS Register of Parks and Gardens of Special Historic Interest in Wales
- Official name: Machen House Garden
- Designated: 1 February 2022
- Reference no.: PGW(Gt)32(NPT)

Listed Building – Grade II
- Official name: Bothy at Machen House
- Designated: 4 October 1990
- Reference no.: 3085

Listed Building – Grade II
- Official name: Bee bole at Machen House
- Designated: 4 October 1990
- Reference no.: 3086

Machen House is a country house in the hamlet of Lower Machen, to the west of the city of Newport, Wales. The house was built in 1831 for the Rev. Charles Augustus Morgan, vicar of Machen and scion of the Morgan family of Tredegar House. In the mid-20th century, Machen was the home of the Conservative politician Peter Thorneycroft, who sat as the Member of Parliament for Monmouth. Machen House is a Grade II* listed building. Its gardens and grounds amount to around 28-acres and are listed at Grade II on the Cadw/ICOMOS Register of Parks and Gardens of Special Historic Interest in Wales. A bothy and a bee bole in the grounds of the house are both listed at Grade II. The house remains a private residence and is not open to the public.

== History ==
Machen House was built in 1831 for the Rev. Charles Augustus Morgan, vicar of Machen and the younger brother of Charles Morgan, 1st Baron Tredegar. The Morgans lived on the Tredegar House estate, and were major landowners in South Wales.

In the mid-20th century, Machen was the home of Peter Thorneycroft, Conservative Member of Parliament for Monmouth, and Chancellor of the Exchequer in the government of Harold Macmillan. (Note: Thorneycroft sat as the M.P. for Monmouth from 1945-1966. In 1957, he was appointed Chancellor of the Exchequer by Macmillan but resigned the following year, in concert with his Treasury colleagues Nigel Birch and Enoch Powell, following their disagreement with the Prime Minister over spending plans. Macmillan famously dismissed their collective resignations as "little local difficulties".) It remains a private residence and is not open to the public.

In 2022, the property was offered for sale at £1,950,000. In 2026, the property was offered for sale at £2,500,000, having received renovation works since the previous listing.

== Architecture and description ==
Cadw notes the Georgian style of the house is supplemented by some Gothic features. Machen House is a Grade II* listed building.

The architectural historian John Newman, in his Gwent/Monmouthshire volume of the Pevsner Buildings of Wales series, writes that "much remains of the Rev. Morgan's elaborate grounds". The gardens also have a number of Gothic features, including castellated walls and the remains of a Chinese Willow pattern bridge, which crosses one of the two small lakes. They are listed at Grade II on the Cadw/ICOMOS Register of Parks and Gardens of Special Historic Interest in Wales.

A bothy and a bee bole in the grounds both have Grade II listings.

== Gallery ==
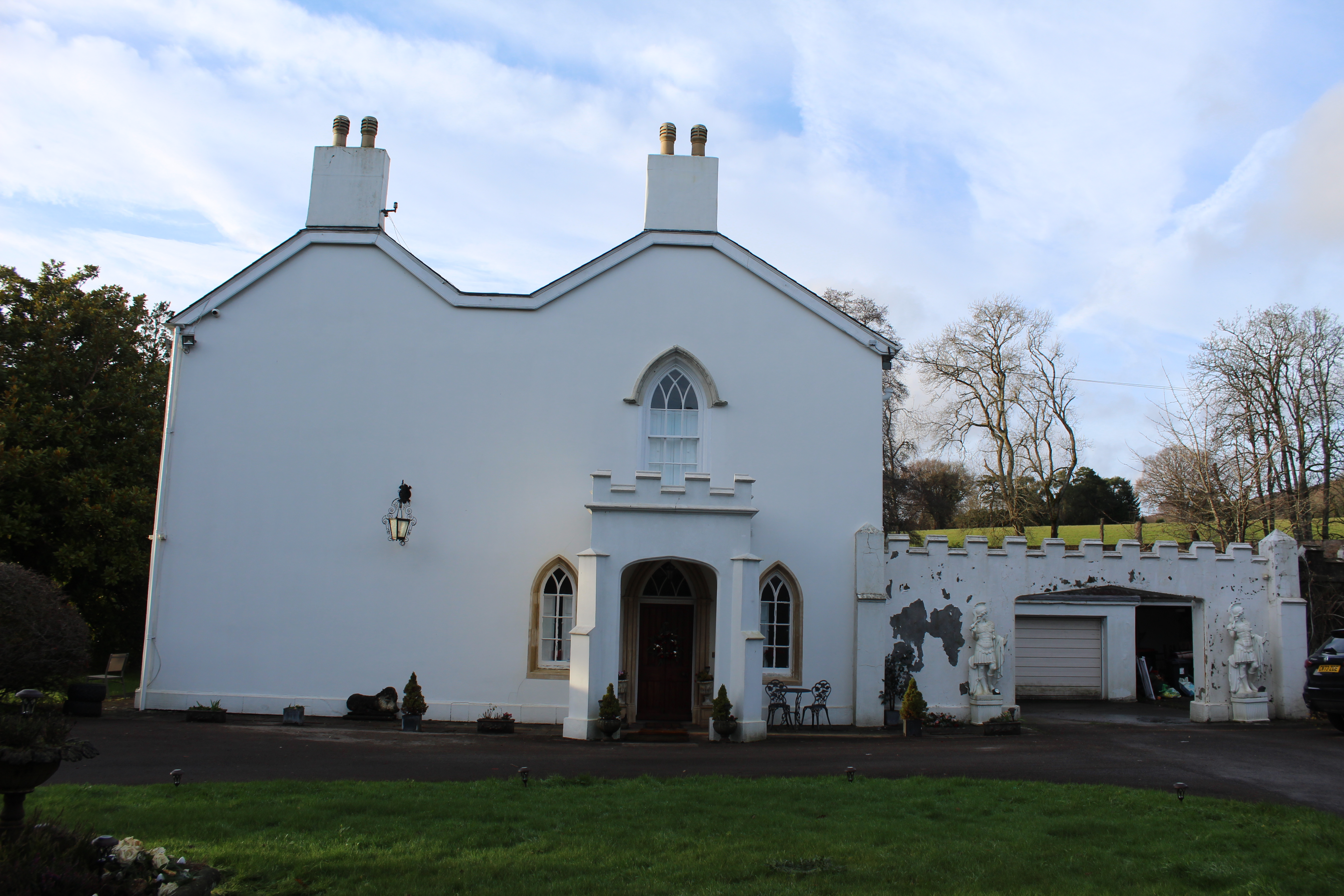
Elevation of the entrance facade.

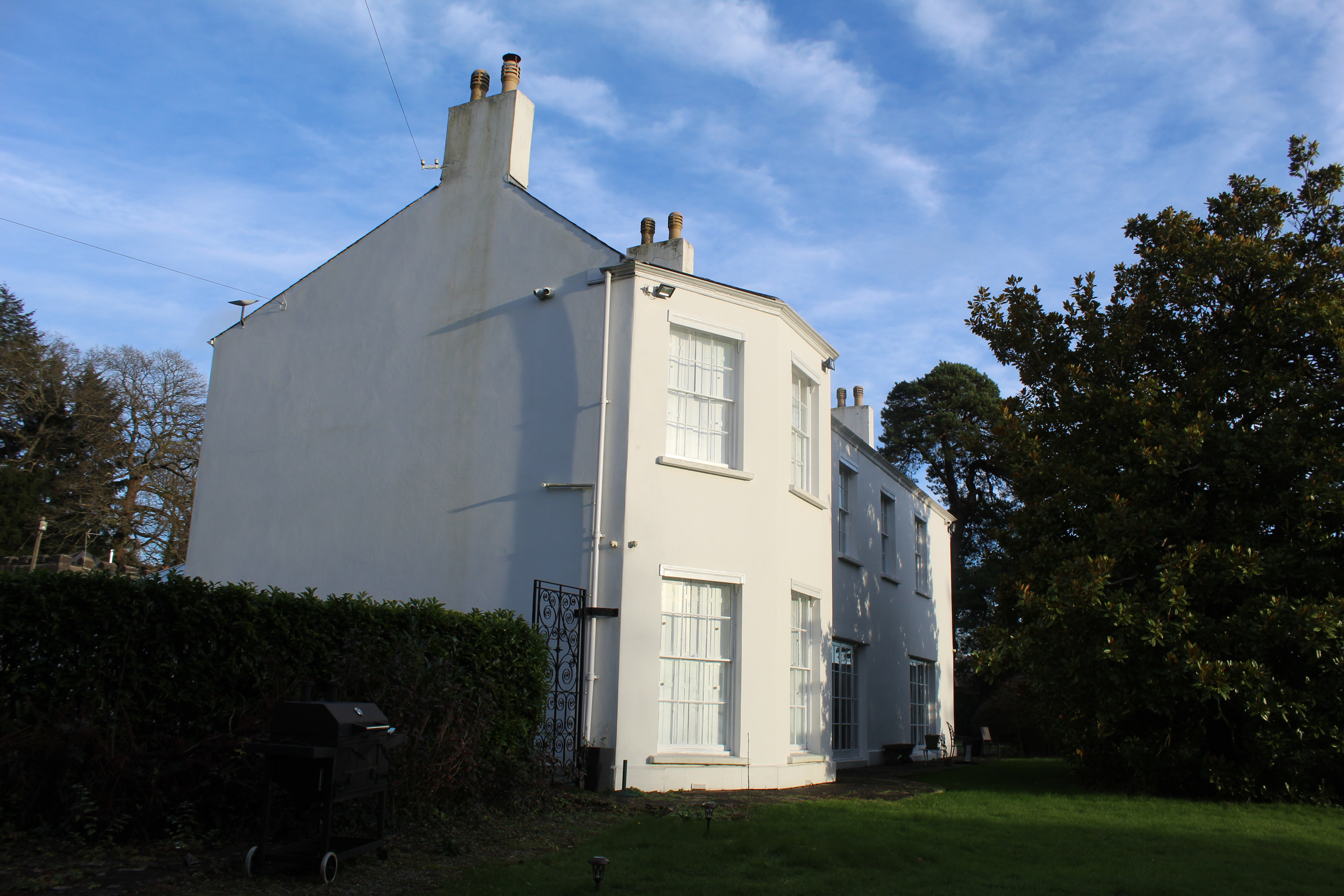
A view of the front garden-facing facade.

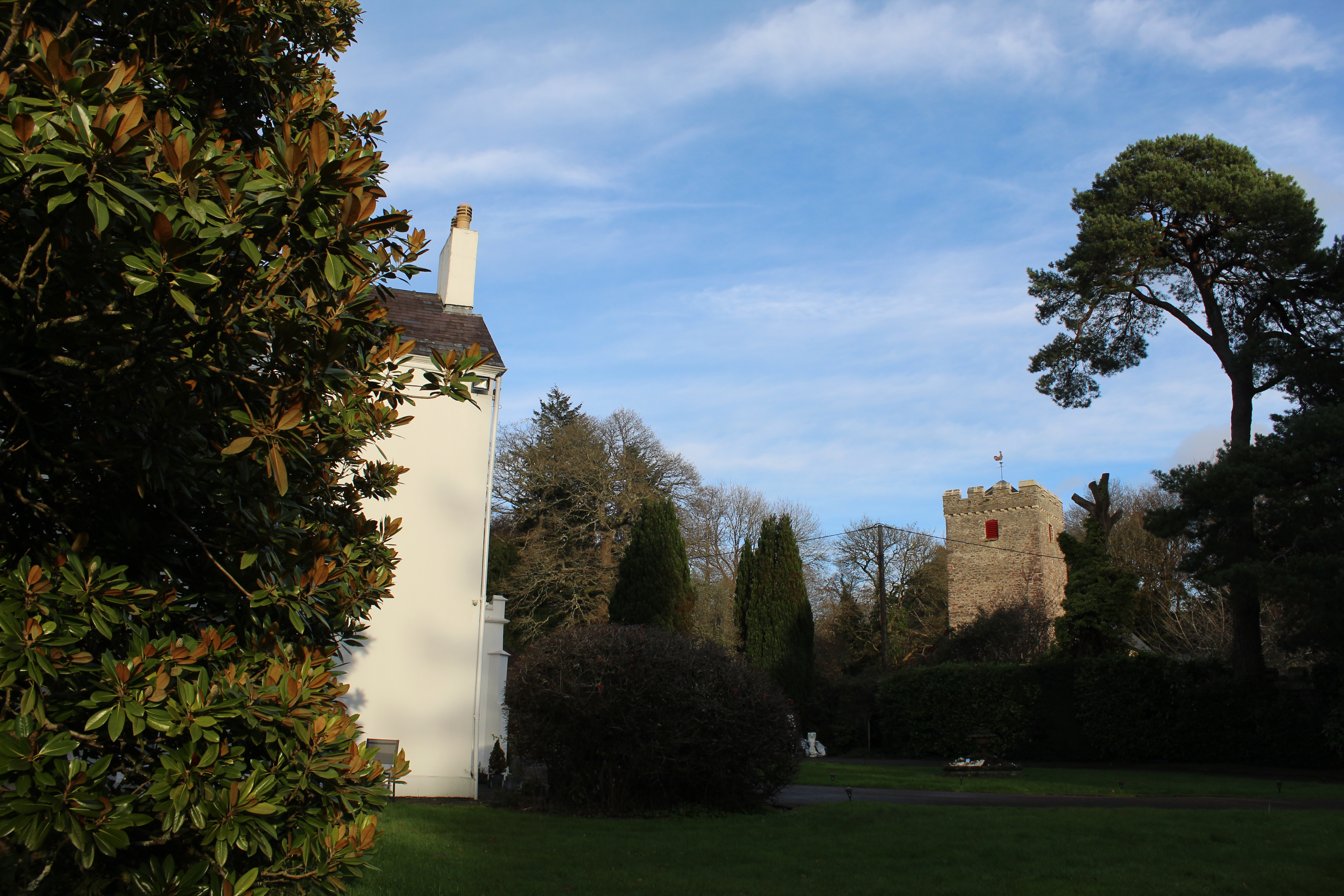
The proximity of St. Michael's and All Angels Church to the house.

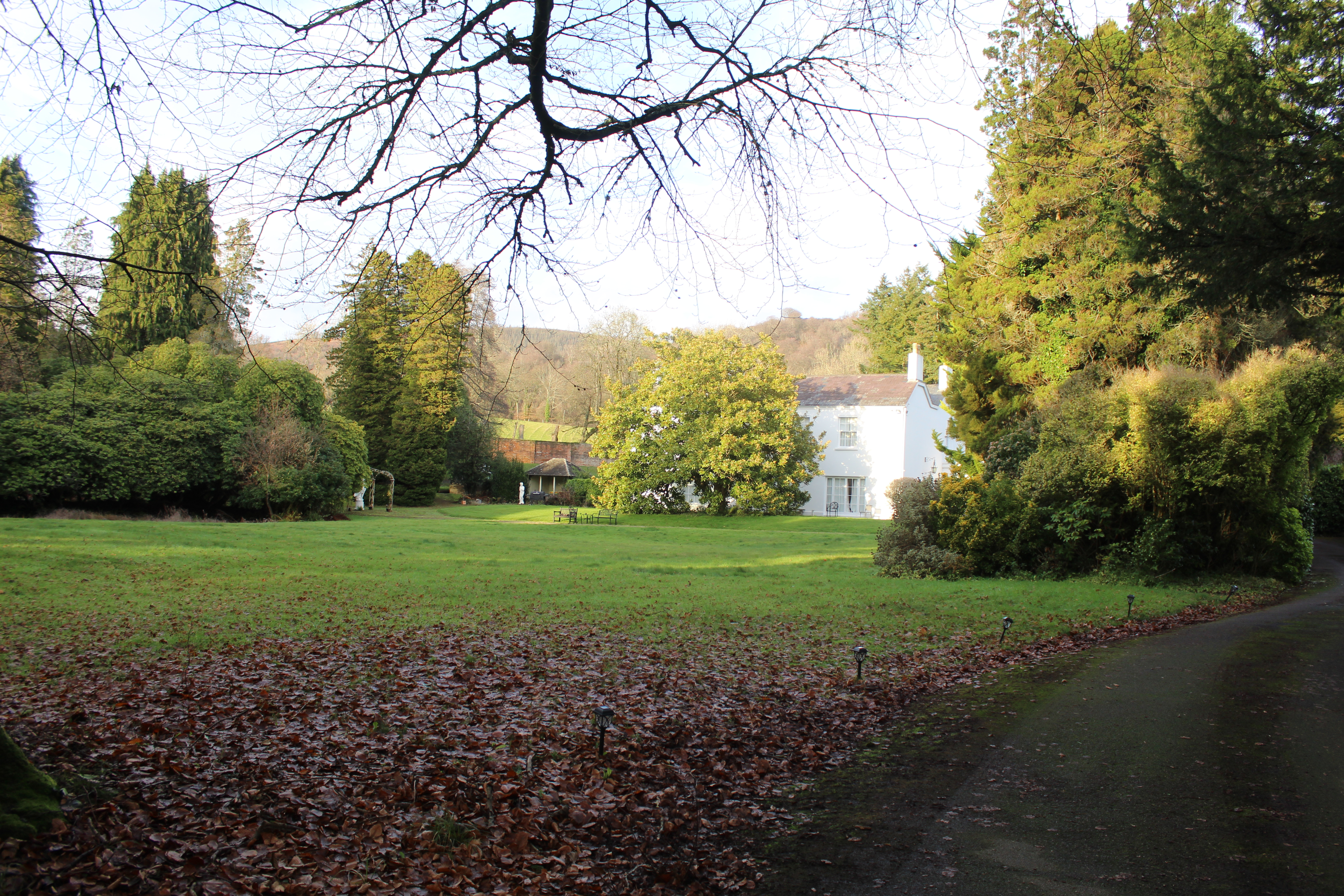
A view of the grounds of Machen House.

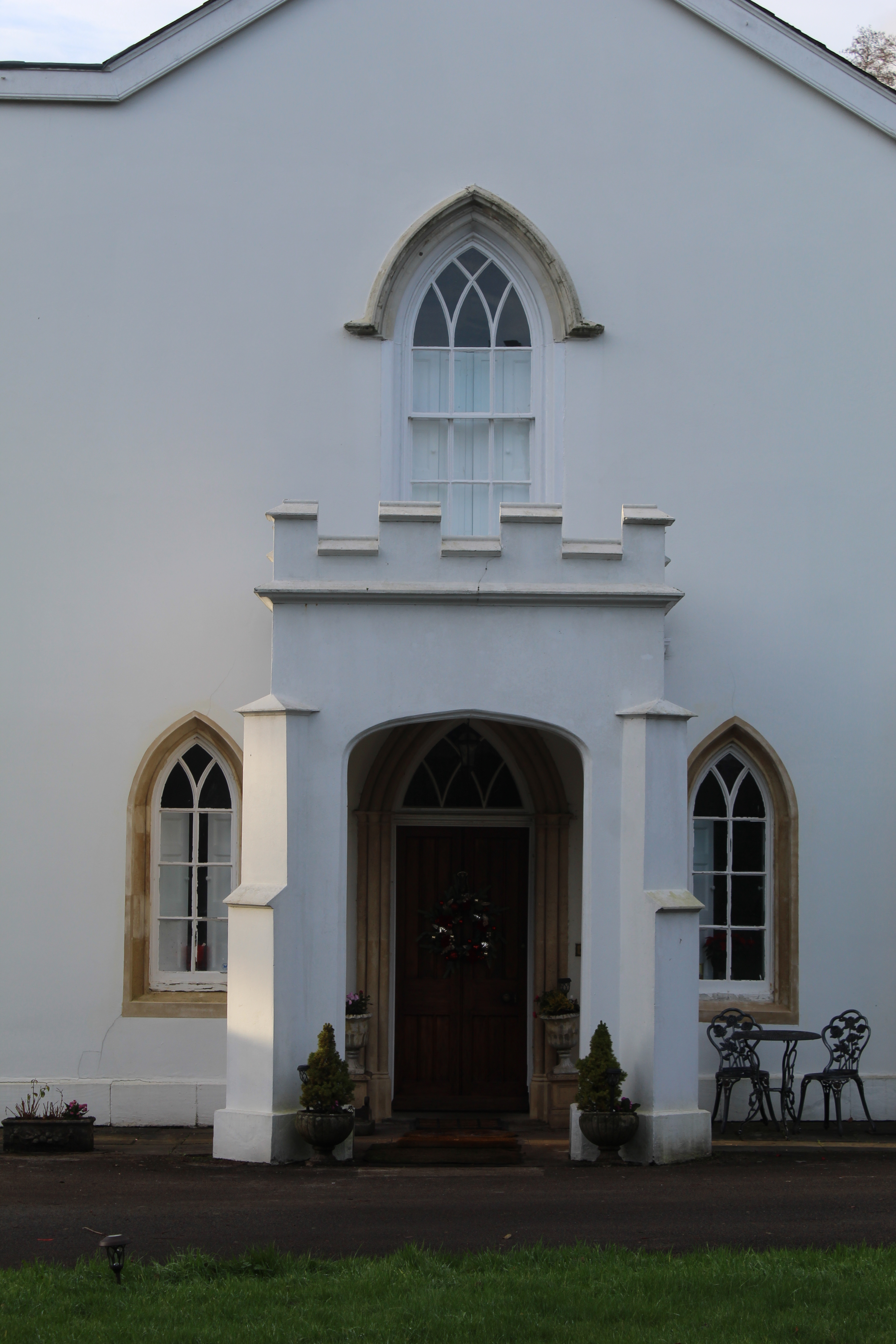
Detail of the entrance porch.

== Sources ==
- Newman, John (2000). Gwent/Monmouthshire. The Buildings of Wales. London: Penguin. ISBN 978-0-140-71053-3. OCLC 248110170.
