= Plas Machen =

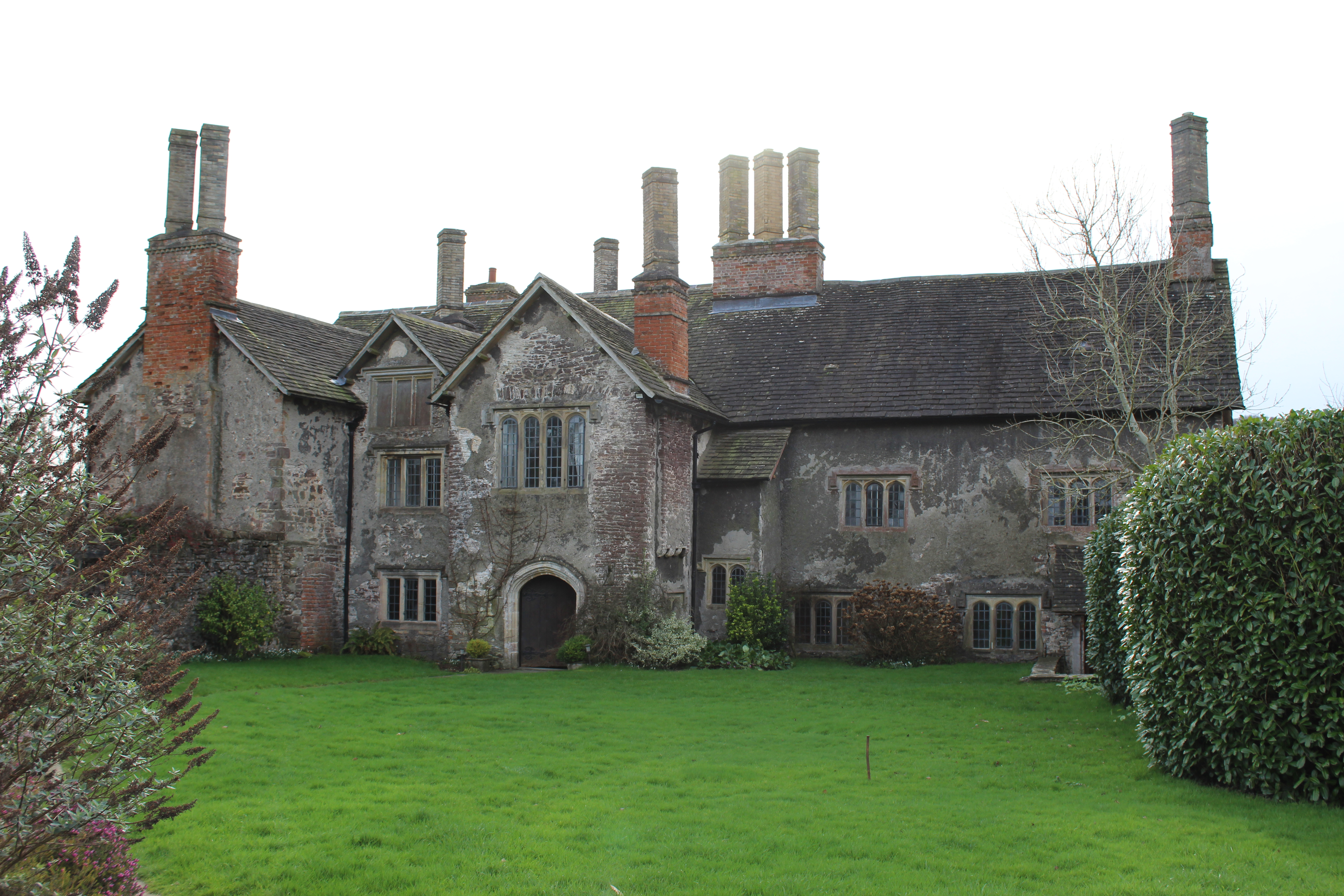
- "a substantial Elizabethan gentry house"

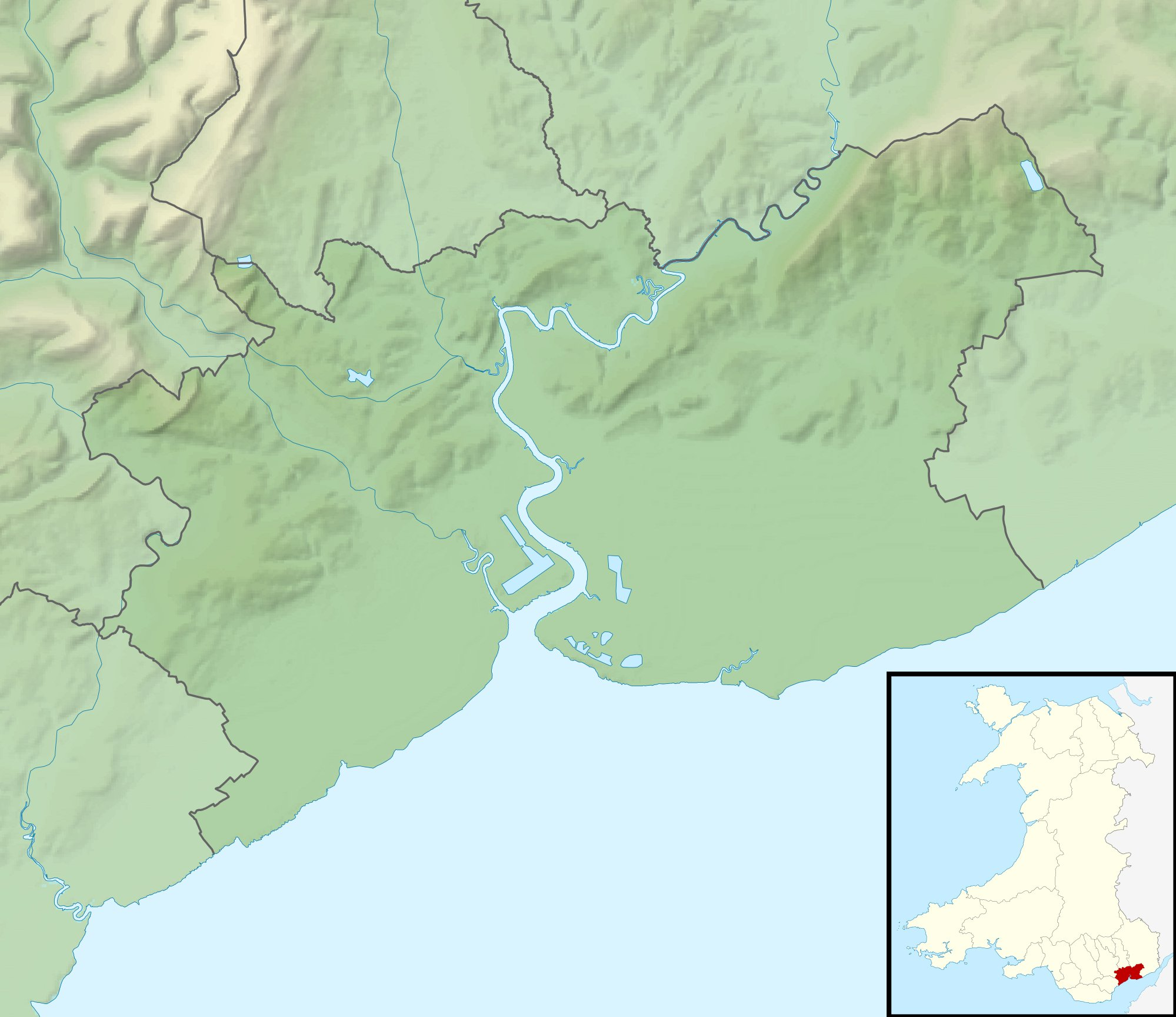
- Location within Newport
- 51.5815°N 3.1059°W
- Type: House
- Location: Lower Machen, Newport, Wales

History
- Built: 16th century, with earlier and later parts

Site notes
- Architectural style: Elizabethan

Listed Building – Grade II*
- Official name: Plas Machen
- Designated: 3 March 1952
- Reference no.: 2905

Cadw/ICOMOS Register of Parks and Gardens of Special Historic Interest in Wales
- Official name: Plas Machen Garden
- Designated: 1 February 2022
- Reference no.: PGW(Gt)33(NPT)

Listed Building – Grade II
- Official name: Nos. 1 & 2 Plas Cottages
- Designated: 18 January 1984
- Reference no.: 3070

Plas Machen is a country house in the hamlet of Lower Machen, in Newport, Wales. The house was built in the late 15th-century and served as the seat of the Machen branch of the Morgan family of South Wales. The Machen Morgans ultimately became the senior branch of the family, thereby inheriting Tredegar House, in nearby Coedkernew. Plas Machen remained the principal seat of the family until their rebuilding of Tredegar House in the 1660s. Plas Machen remained in the ownership of the Morgan family and was leased to tenants until the dispersal of the Tredegar Estate in the 1950s. It is a Grade II* listed building. The gardens are listed at Grade II on the Cadw/ICOMOS Register of Parks and Gardens of Special Historic Interest in Wales. The house remains a private residence and is not open to the public.

== History ==
=== Morgans of Machen and Tredegar ===
The earliest recorded link between the Morgan family of South Wales and Machen is to the building of Plas Machen by "Morgan of Machen who led men of Gwent at Bosworth in 1485". In the following centuries, the family became one of the wealthiest and most powerful in South Wales. (Note: 14 members of the family are buried in the Morgan Chapel at the nearby Church of St Michael and All Angels in the hamlet of Lower Machen.) In the 1660s William Morgan (c.1640-1680) rebuilt Tredegar House as the centrepiece of the family's estates in Monmouthshire, Glamorganshire and Brecknockshire. In the 19th century, Sir Charles Morgan was created Baron Tredegar, and in the early 20th century, his son Godfrey was elevated in the peerage as Viscount Tredegar. The viscountcy was revived for his nephew, Courtenay Morgan, in 1926, but became extinct on the death of Courtenay's son, Evan in 1949, after which the family's landholdings in South Wales were sold. (Note: Evan's cousin, John Morgan, the sixth and final Baron Tredegar, oversaw the sale of the family's landholdings in South Wales, including Tredegar House and Ruperra Castle, becoming a tax exile in Monte Carlo, and dying in 1962 following an operation in London.)

=== Plas Machen ===
The Royal Commission on the Ancient and Historical Monuments of Wales gives building dates for Plas Machen as the "15th, 16th, 17th centur[ies] and later". Cadw suggests that the house reached its greatest extent in the 1600s, before being superseded by Tredegar House as the family's main residence. It was much reduced in size in the 19th century, before restoration by Habershon and Pite in 1859. The Morgans retained ownership, although they ceased to live at the house by around 1800. The house, and some associated barns, have been partially restored in the 21st century.

== Architecture and description ==
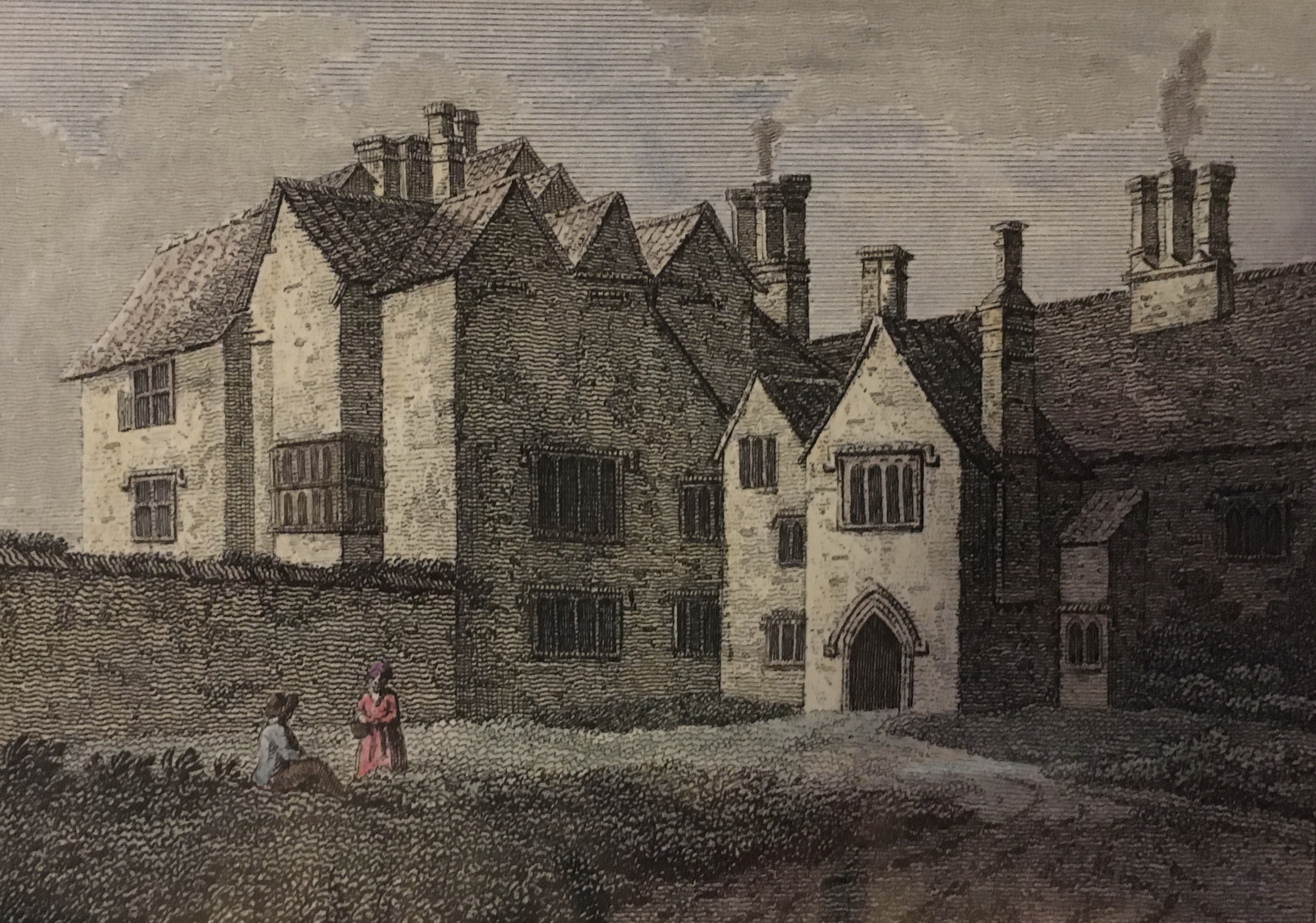
An engraving of Plas Machen, dated to 1800.

The house is built of rubble stone with brick chimney stacks. Archdeacon Coxe saw the house when it was still complete during a visit in 1800 and recorded his impressions in his two-volume, An Historical Tour in Monmouthshire. Of the interior, Coxe noted a circular room devoted to hunting, with a ceiling centrepiece of the goddess Diana and decorative scenes depicting important local houses and churches, together with hunting images. This was located in part of the house subsequently demolished. The gardens retain their Tudor skeleton, with a series of terraces and axes leading down to a fish pond. While the outline of the formal gardens remains, much has now been returned to pasture.

Plas Machen is a Grade II* listed building. Its gardens and grounds are listed at Grade II on the Cadw/ICOMOS Register of Parks and Gardens of Special Historic Interest in Wales. A pair of cottages built by the Tredegar Estate just north of the farmyard at Plas Machen also have a Grade II listing.
