= Institute of Historic Building Conservation =

UK professional body

Institute of Historic Building Conservation (IHBC)
- Predecessor: Association of Conservation Officers
- Formation: 1997
- Type: Professional body, charitable body
- Headquarters: IHBC, Jubilee House, High Street, TISBURY SP3 6HA
- Region served: United Kingdom
- Members: 2730 (2020)
- President: Mike Brown
- Chair: David McDonald
- Director: Seán O'Reilly
- Main organ: Context
- Staff: 7
- Website: www.ihbc.org.uk

The Institute of Historic Building Conservation (IHBC) is a professional body in the United Kingdom which was formed as a charitable trust company in 1997 by members of the former Association of Conservation Officers. The object was to widen the scope of the profession from those mainly concerned with the statutory regulation of the historic environment to all those who practice professionally in historic and built environment conservation.

== Membership ==
The Institute has about 2,700 members in three categories:

- Full Members (IHBC): who have demonstrated interdisciplinary practice standards in line with ICOMOS conservation standards and World Bank project management models. They may use the suffix 'IHBC' after their name and are listed in the institute's Annual Yearbook and selectively on its online register.
- Associates (AssocIHBC): who have demonstrated standards comparable to Full Members, but in a single area of practice. They are also listed in the Institute's Annual Yearbook and selectively on its online register.
- Affiliates: Aspiring to IHBC accreditation, but with no certification or registration.

Membership is open to those in place-making and other heritage-related professions with specific expertise in the historic environment, principally town planners, architects, building conservation specialists and surveyors. The membership also includes engineers, educators, architectural historians, urban designers, archaeologists, garden historians and landscape architects.

Applicants for full membership must demonstrate their professional competence in four areas:

- Professional – philosophy; practice
- Practical, evaluation – history; research, recording and analysis
- Practical, management – legislation and policy; finance and economics
- Practical, intervention _ design and presentation; technology

Professional standards are maintained through a Code of Professional Conduct, mandatory continuing professional development, and by peer review.

== What IHBC members do ==
IHBC members undertake a range of professional and specialist roles in the historic buildings sector in accordance with their individual professional training, accreditation, skills and interests.

- The evaluation of historic places, buildings, materials and fabric, their origins, history, significance and capacity for change.
- Historic building repairs and maintenance in line with current understanding of historic and modern technologies.
- The adaptation of historic buildings, areas and places for 21st century uses.
- Promoting heritage-led building and area regeneration as a basis for sound economic and social development.
- The design of new buildings and developments in heritage contexts.
- Promoting the intrinsic sustainability of heritage and its adaptability in the light of climate change.
- Undertaking and promoting design quality in the conservation and change of historic buildings and places.
- Promoting the valuing of heritage as a cultural asset.

== IHBC's conservation values ==
The conservation values of the IHBC are founded on those of ICOMOS (International Council on Monuments and Sites) which derive from the Athens Charter of 1931 and, more specifically, the Venice Charter of 1964.

- The need to retain historic buildings and their fabric as evidence of our shared cultural heritage.
- The inseparability of historic buildings from their history, fixtures, decoration and setting.
- The proper application of science and technology to conservation.
- The importance of socially useful purposes for historic buildings areas and places within the constraints dictated by their fabric.
- The need for conservation to be evidence based, the minimum necessary to achieve a sustainable future for the building (The Precautionary Principle), the reversibility of alterations and the capability of removing additions.
- The retention of all significant fabric of a building including later additions as evidence of its history. A record of restorations and alterations to be properly archived.
- The importance of new work being identifiable as such and being of a scale and style that is harmonious with it.
- The economic and social value of heritage in the maintenance, restoration and establishment of places.
- The value of historic buildings, area and places in social cohesion and cultural development.

== Governance ==
The centre of the Institute's governance is its board of trustees, styled the 'Council'. This is supported by a wider advisory Council and four Committees, each of which may have subsidiary panels and interest groups.

- Membership and Ethics Committee
- Education, Training and Standards Committee
- Policy Committee
- Communications and Outreach Committee

== Branches ==
The IHBC has branches, 10 for the English Regions and one each for Scotland, Wales and Northern Ireland. The branches organise their own programmes of events and host, periodically, the IHBC's Annual School, its main continuing professional development event of the year.

== IHBC operations ==
The Institute has no formal premises. It operates mainly by electronic communication with its trustees, staff and volunteers working from wherever they are based. Meetings, when required, are held mainly in London but also in other centers.

Operations are planned and carried out in accordance with objectives set in the current Corporate Plan:

- helping people by promoting the conservation and management of historic places as a unique and evolving resource for people, both today and in the future.
- helping conservation by supporting specialists, specialisms and specialist interests across all conservation-related activities, because effective conservation demands skilled care.
- helping conservation specialists by supporting, encouraging and challenging IHBC members and prospective members, because conservation specialists work most effectively with co-ordination, advice, inspiration and scrutiny provided by an informed professional body.

Specific operations include:

- IHBC Enterprises, the trading arm of the IHBC which undertakes historic environment sectoral research, project development, project management and event organisation.
- HESPR The Historic Environment Service Provider Recognition is the IHBC's quality assured register of accredited conservation practitioners and firms
- Weekly e-mail alerts which provide links to the Institute's heritage news service the IHBC's 'NewsBlogs'.

== Publications ==
The IHBC is active in the publication of conservation and heritage information and guidance:

- Website: The IHBC maintains a major web resource for its members, conservation practitioners in general and the public
- IHBC Yearbook: The IHBC publishes a year book which contains a review of current issues as well as a directory of its membership.
- Context: a printed journal issued five times per year

== Affiliations ==
Formal memberships of UK bodies include

- The Heritage Alliance
- Built Environment Forum Scotland (BEFS)
- Place Alliance
- Council on Training in Architectural Conservation (COTAC)
- Sustainable Traditional Building Alliance (STBA)
- National Planning Forum
- Civic Voice

International memberships include

- European Federation for Architectural Heritage Skills – Fédération Européenne pour les Métiers du Patrimoine bâti (FEMP)

Memoranda of Understanding: Chartered Institute for Archaeologists (CIfA) Council on Training in Architectural Conservation (COTAC) (pending)

Partnerships and other collective operations include

- The Heritage Gateway
- Joint Committee of the National Amenity Societies (JCNAS)
- The Historic Environment Forum
- Sustainable Traditional Building Alliance (STBA)
- The Scottish Traditional Building Forum
