= Uskmouth =

Area of Newport, Wales

Coordinates: 51°32′46″N 2°57′24″W

Uskmouth (Welsh: Aberwysg) is an area to the south of the city of Newport, South Wales.

== Location ==
Uskmouth is effectively in the west of the village of Nash. It is at Uskmouth that the River Usk meets the Severn estuary.

== Amenities ==
It includes part of the Newport Wetlands Reserve , a notable wildlife reserve , with reed beds and grasslands that attract breeding birds such as lapwings, redshanks, oystercatchers, little ringed plovers and ringed plovers, as well as visitors such as wigeons, shovelers, teals, shelducks and pintails, bitterns, hen harriers and short-eared owls. It is part of the Caldicot Levels.

Following storms in the autumn of 1986, a track of human footprints was discovered eroding out of the clays in the intertidal zone in front of Uskmouth Power Station. The footprints were found to contain peat deposits, allowing them to be carbon dated to 4200BC. At the time they were the oldest known human footprints in Britain, but in 2013 footprints made about 800,000 years ago were discovered in Happisburgh, Norfolk.
