= West Usk Lighthouse =

Lighthouse tower near Newport, Wales

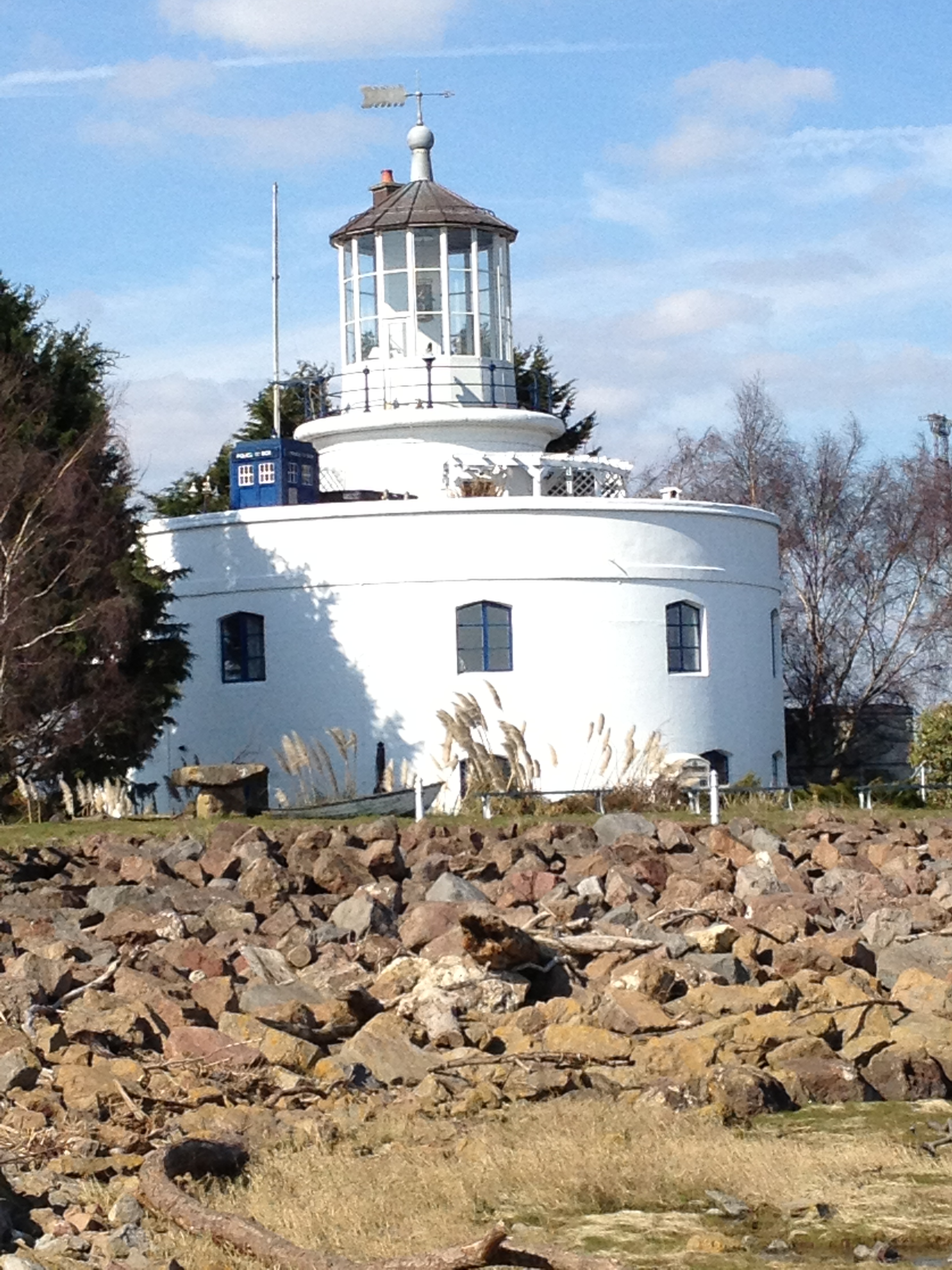
- West Usk Lighthouse, 2013
- Location: Uskmouth; Newport; Wales; United Kingdom
- OS grid: ST3111582882
- Coordinates: 51.54061°N 2.99465°W

Tower
- Constructed: 1821
- Built by: James Walker
- Construction: brick tower
- Height: 17 metres (56 ft)
- Shape: cylindrical tower with balcony and lantern rising from a 2-storey keeper’s house
- Markings: white tower and lantern
- Operator: West Usk Lighthouse
- Heritage: Grade II listed building

Light
- Deactivated: 1922

West Usk Lighthouse is a Grade II-listed building on the Severn Estuary at the mouth of the River Usk south of the city of Newport, South Wales.

== History ==
The lighthouse was constructed in 1821. It was the first to be built by James Walker (1781–1862), a prominent Scottish civil engineer. Amongst other projects, Walker went on to build another 21 lighthouses. The land around the lighthouse has been reclaimed as farmland but it stood on an island until 1856. It was decommissioned as an operational lighthouse in 1922.

The lighthouse is currently operating as a hotel. For hotel guests, a private road off the B4239 (Lighthouse Road) leads to the lighthouse. Alternatively, it may be reached by a 1 kilometre (0.62 mi) walk along the sea wall footpath from the car park of the Lighthouse Inn on Beach Road. The lighthouse is situated next to the Pont-y-cwcw Reen. It was featured in July 2008 on an episode of the Channel 5 television series The Hotel Inspector and in 2020 on the Doctor Who twelfth series episode "Fugitive of the Judoon". The lighthouse is a Grade II listed building.

The less substantial East Usk Lighthouse, on the opposite bank of the River Usk, is within the Newport Wetlands wildlife reserve.

== See also ==
- List of lighthouses in Wales

== Sources ==
- Jones, Stephen K. (2009). Brunel in South Wales. Vol. II: Communications and Coal. Stroud: The History Press. ISBN 9780752449128.
