= Nash, Newport =

Village near Newport in South Wales

Nash: Welsh: Trefonnen
- Village and community
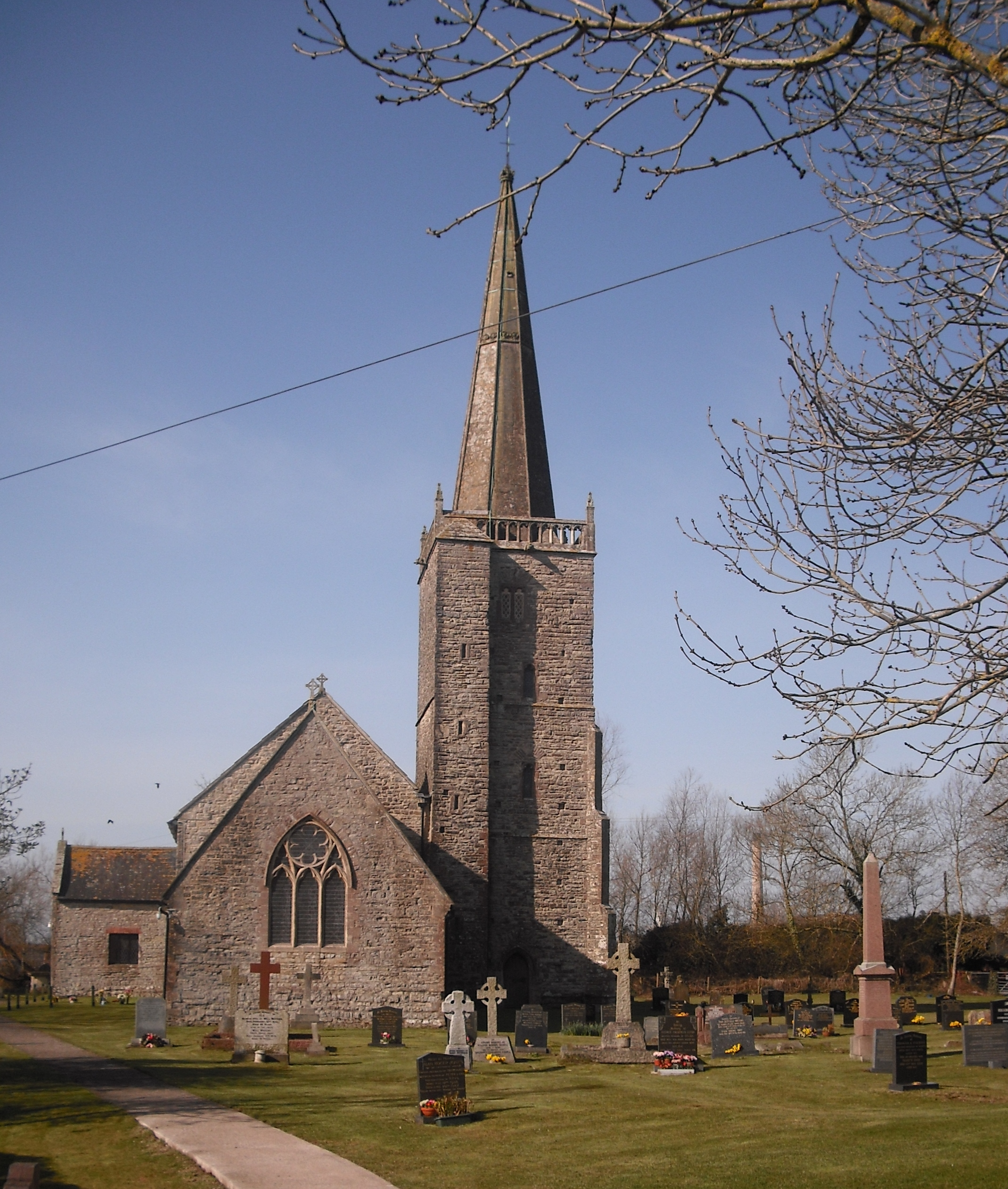
- Church of St Mary

- Location within Newport
- Population: 284 (2011 census)
- Community: Nash
- Principal area: Newport
- Preserved county: Gwent
- Country: Wales
- Sovereign state: United Kingdom
- Post town: NEWPORT
- Postcode district: NP18, NP19
- Dialling code: 01633; Maindee exchange
- Police: Gwent
- Fire: South Wales
- Ambulance: Welsh
- UK Parliament: Newport East
- Senedd Cymru – Welsh Parliament: Newport East
- List of places UK Wales Newport 51.549°N 2.946°W Map of the community

Historical population
Year	Pop.	±%
2001	281	—
2011	284	+1.1%
Source: 2001 and 2011 Censuses

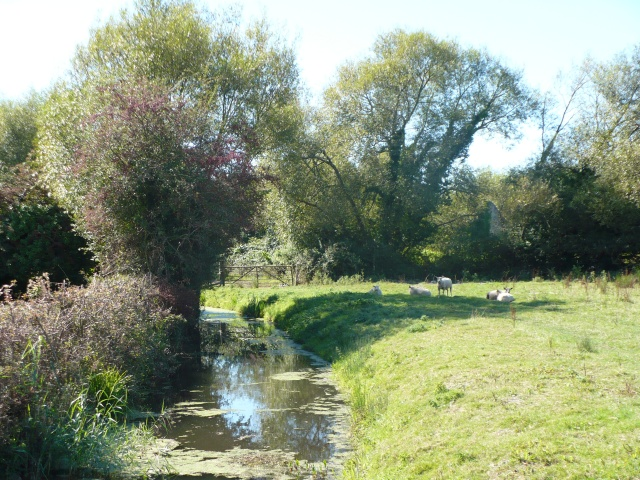
Sheep, in the shade of a withy tree, beside a reen

Nash (Welsh: Trefonnen) is a village and community to the south of the city of Newport, South Wales, in the Lliswerry ward.

== Origin of the name ==
The name is thought to originate from a contraction of "An Ash" (tree), meaning literally `place of the ash tree(s)'. This is supported by its appearance in deeds as "De Fraxino" (fraxinus was the Latin name for the ash tree). The Welsh name is Trefonnen, given in older sources as Tre'r onnen, also meaning Town (tref) of the Ash (onnen).

Nash and nearby Goldcliff, as Nash and Goldcliffe, are two of the few villages to appear on the Cambriae Typus map of 1573.

== Location ==
Nash lies about 2 miles (3.2 km) to the south of the built-up area of the city of Newport, on the Caldicot levels, a large area of land reclaimed from the sea and crossed by drainage channels and reens. In addition to the village itself, the parish contains Uskmouth power stations and part of the Newport Wetlands nature reserve, including its Visitors Centre which was opened in 2008.

The City of Newport campus of Coleg Gwent (commonly referred to as 'Nash College') is actually in the neighbouring parish of Lliswerry.

Together with the neighbouring parishes of Goldcliff and Whitson, Nash is one of the "Three Parishes" which have long been treated as a unit – geographical, socially, economically and ecclesiastically.

The parish is bounded to the south by the sea (Bristol Channel), to the east by the lower reaches of the River Usk, and to the north by Lliswerry and the Llanwern steelworks site. To the east lie Goldcliff and Whitson.

== History ==
In 1901 the only four private residents are listed as Mrs Morgan at "Greenfield", Mrs Morgan at "The Elms", Rev. C. W. Triton (Baptist minister, but curiously no separate residence given) and Miss Ester Wilcox at "Decoy Pool". Some twenty-nine commercial interests include mostly farmers (22) but also William German, blacksmith and wheelwright, at "Pye Corner"; Mrs Sarah Jones, publican, at "Waterloo Inn"; John Skuse, shop-keeper, at Broadstreet Common; Edward Tamplin, butcher, at "Box Cottage"; David Thomas, farm bailiff to Mr. James Thomas, at "Pye Corner Farm"; John Watkins, butcher; and Lewis Williams, mason, at "Ash Cottage".

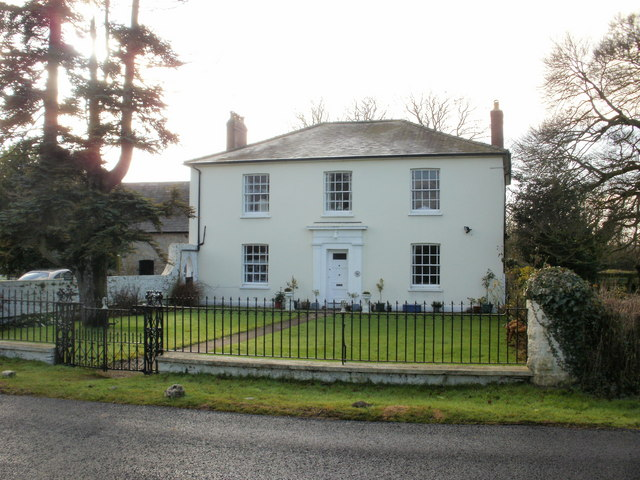
Fair Orchard

A large part of the village, including Farmfield House, was lost in the construction of the Uskmouth power station and the adjoining huge ash-pits in 1959. Although the main part of the village is centred around the church in West Nash, much of the village is set along the wide Broadstreet Common, accessed via Pye Corner or Straits Lane, and which provides the more direct route to Whitson and Redwick. For many years the German family were the village blacksmiths at Pye Corner with the premises eventually becoming a petrol station. The site is now occupied by the offices of the Caldicot and Wentloog Levels Internal Drainage Board. About 400 metres (440 yd) south of Pye Corner is Fair Orchard, dating from the early 19th century, which is a Grade II listed building. The village had its own small infants' school, built in 1877, on West Nash Road. It closed in the early 1980s and has now been converted into a private dwelling.

== The church ==
The Church of St Mary in West Nash dates from the 12th century. Known as "the Cathedral of the Moors", it is notable for its fine tower and spire. The church belonged to Goldcliff Priory in 1349 when the benefice was held by Robert Arney. Later members of the Arney family left a cottage and six acres of land, called "The Poor's Six Acres", for the support of the poor of the parish. The church was largely rebuilt during the 16th century.

The only remains of the Norman church are the north wall of the chancel and the squint. An unusual feature, the squint or hagioscope was used to enable those with leprosy, smallpox or other such diseases to see or participate in the service without endangering the rest of the congregation with infection. The tower is unusually located on the north side of the chancel. The church is thought to originally have been much larger, incorporating a north aisle. In the 20th century the bellringers' room was used as a temporary mortuary for the bodies of five sailors who had drowned in a storm, near the East Usk Lighthouse. During World War II the church saw congregations of 400. The interior, following restoration in 2004–2005, is notable for its complete set of 18th-century furnishings, with box pews, a three-decker pulpit and a western gallery. In the fields to the south of the neighbouring Church Farm are ancient tumuli and remnants of a possibly mediæval dwelling or chapel.

== Baptist chapel ==
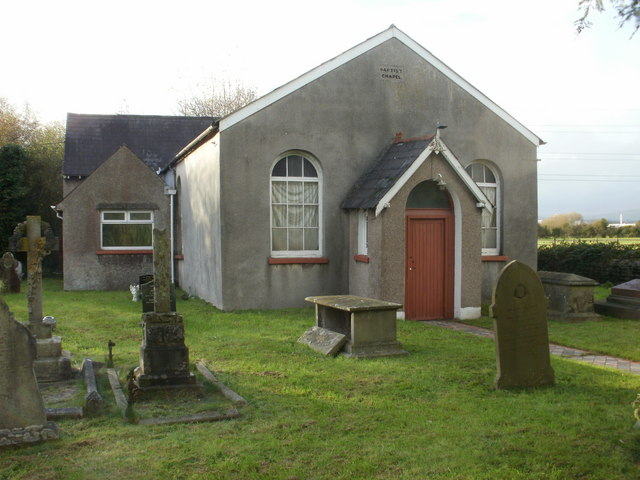
Former Baptist Chapel, Pye Corner

At Pye Corner is the former Baptist chapel. The chapel, which opened in 1820 or 1822, had seating for 125 and a congregation which included residents of what was then the hamlet of Lliswerry, about 1 mile (1.6 km) to the north. When Lliswerry Baptist Church opened in 1889 some of the Pye Corner congregation transferred their allegiance there. In the same year Lliswerry was incorporated into Newport under the provisions of the Newport (Mon.) Corporation Act, 1889. A steady decline in attendances at Nash led to only five members remaining in 1988 and the chapel closed shortly afterwards. It was later converted to a private house.

== Amenities ==
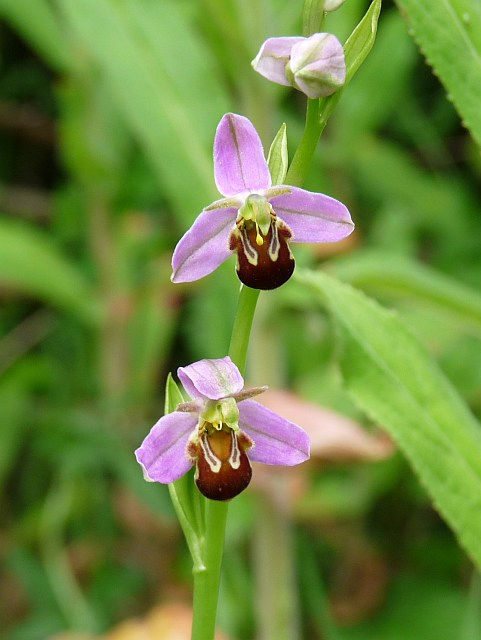
Ophrys apifera at Newport Wetlands Reserve

To the north of church, at the end of St. Mary's Road, is the Waterloo Inn public house, a tenanted free-house. A Victorian pub, it has a stone sign above the entrance stating it was rebuilt in 1898. Inside are pictures and weaponry from the Battle of Waterloo. A modern Community Hall has been built nearby.

Located at the edge of the Newport Wetlands Reserve, East Usk Lighthouse is a notable landmark. Parts of Nash are designated a Site of Special Scientific Interest SSSI.

In October 2009, two 2.5-megawatt wind turbines were installed on the site owned by chemical company Solutia UK Ltd. These will supply up to one-third of the facility's electricity needs.

== Present-day Nash ==
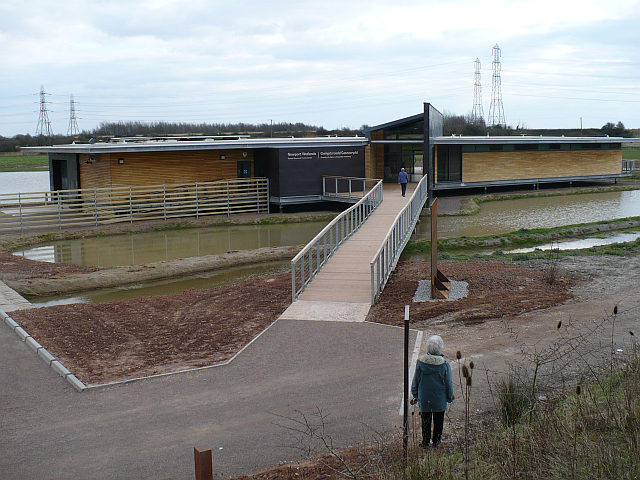
Entrance to Newport Wetlands Visitor Centre

Several road schemes have proposed a southern relief motorway loop for Newport, as a way of mitigating the congestion of the existing M4 motorway. Many of these schemes have involved intrusion, to a greater or lesser extent, into Nash. As a result Nash Community Council became a member of the "Campaign Against the Levels Motorway" (CALM) Alliance formed to oppose such schemes by the Friends of the Earth Cymru. The bypass scheme was eventually cancelled in July 2009.

In June 2010, a public meeting was held at the village Community Centre to discuss proposals for a waste incinerator in Newport. Members of the "Stop Newport Incinerator Campaign (SNIC)" organised the meeting to explain to residents the possible development on Bowleaze Common land south of Llanwern steelworks.

== Government ==
The area is governed by Newport City Council and the Nash community council. The village falls within the Llanwern ward of the Newport East parliamentary constituency.
