= Thomas Morris (surveyor) =

19th-century Welsh surveyor

Thomas Morris (c1790 – August 1863) was a nineteenth century surveyor and local politician, born in Newland, Gloucestershire, and active in Newport, Monmouthshire. He contributed to the documentation of the Caldicot and Wentloog Levels levels by producing detailed maps.
