= Newport Wetlands =

- Gwlyptiroedd Casnewydd
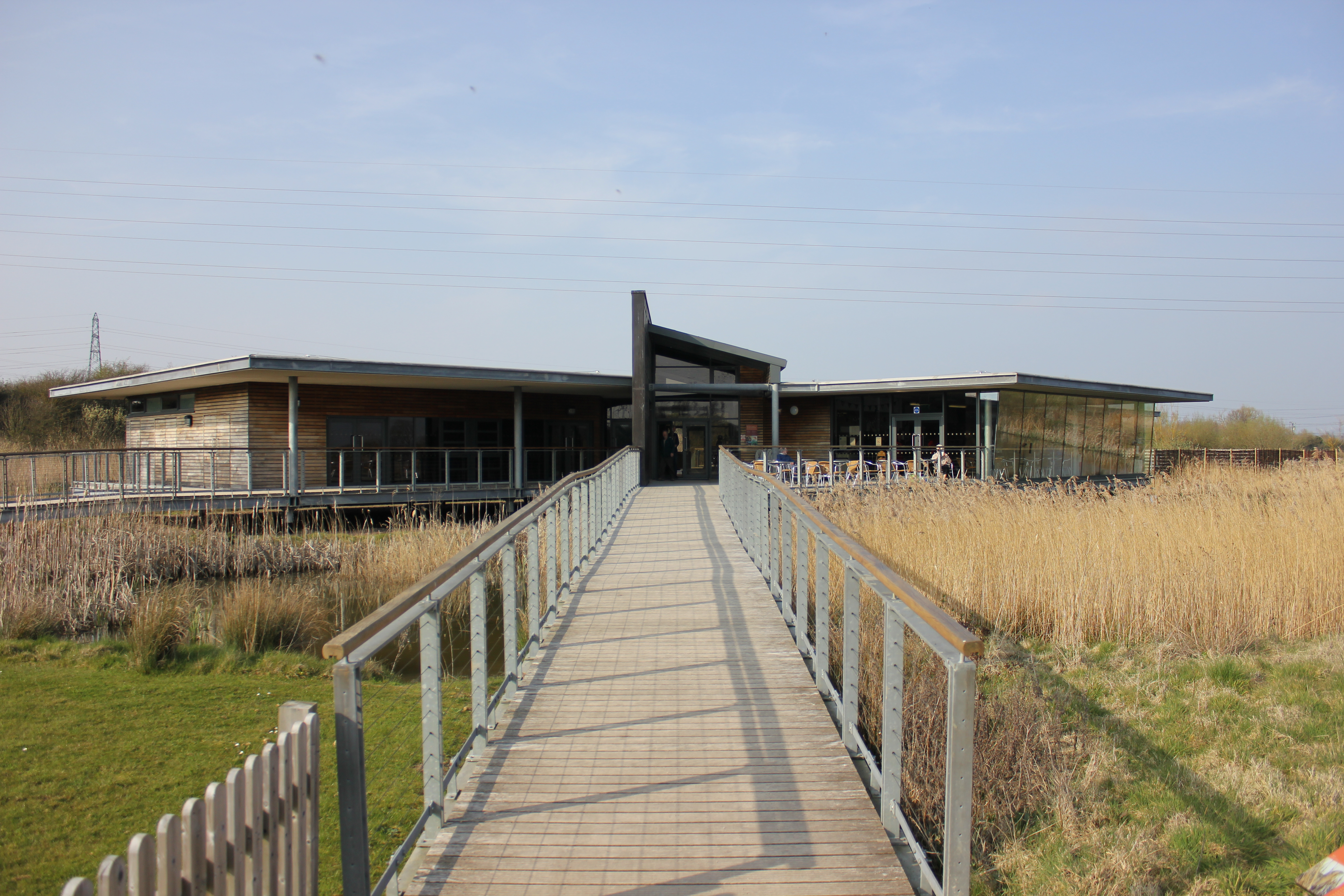
- Wetlands visitor centre, West Nash, Newport

- Location within Wales
- Type: National nature reserve
- Nearest city: Newport, Wales
- Coordinates: 51.546°N 2.961°W
- Area: 437 hectares (1,080 acres)
- Created: 2000
- Operator: Countryside Council for Wales; RSPB
- Website: www.rspb.org.uk/reserves-and-events/reserves-a-z/newport-wetlands/

Newport Wetlands is a wildlife reserve covering parts of Uskmouth, Nash and Goldcliff, in the south-east of the city of Newport, South Wales.

== History ==
The reserve was established in 2000 to mitigate losses of wildlife habitat when the Cardiff Bay Barrage scheme was undertaken.

The site is owned and managed by Natural Resources Wales, the successor body to the Countryside Council for Wales. A purpose-built visitor and education centre in West Nash was opened in March 2008 by the Royal Society for the Protection of Birds (RSPB) with help from Newport City Council and water level management assistance by Caldicot and Wentloog Levels Internal Drainage Board.

The reserve covers 437 hectares (1,080 acres) of the Caldicot Level, a low-lying area of land bordering the northern shore of the Severn Estuary. Part of the site is a reclaimed fuel ash disposal site, although some farmland in Goldcliff and Nash has also had to be flooded to complete the work.

The reserve was made a national nature reserve on 16 April 2008.

In January 2024 the reserve was the focus for the BBC programme Countryfile.

== Access and facilities ==
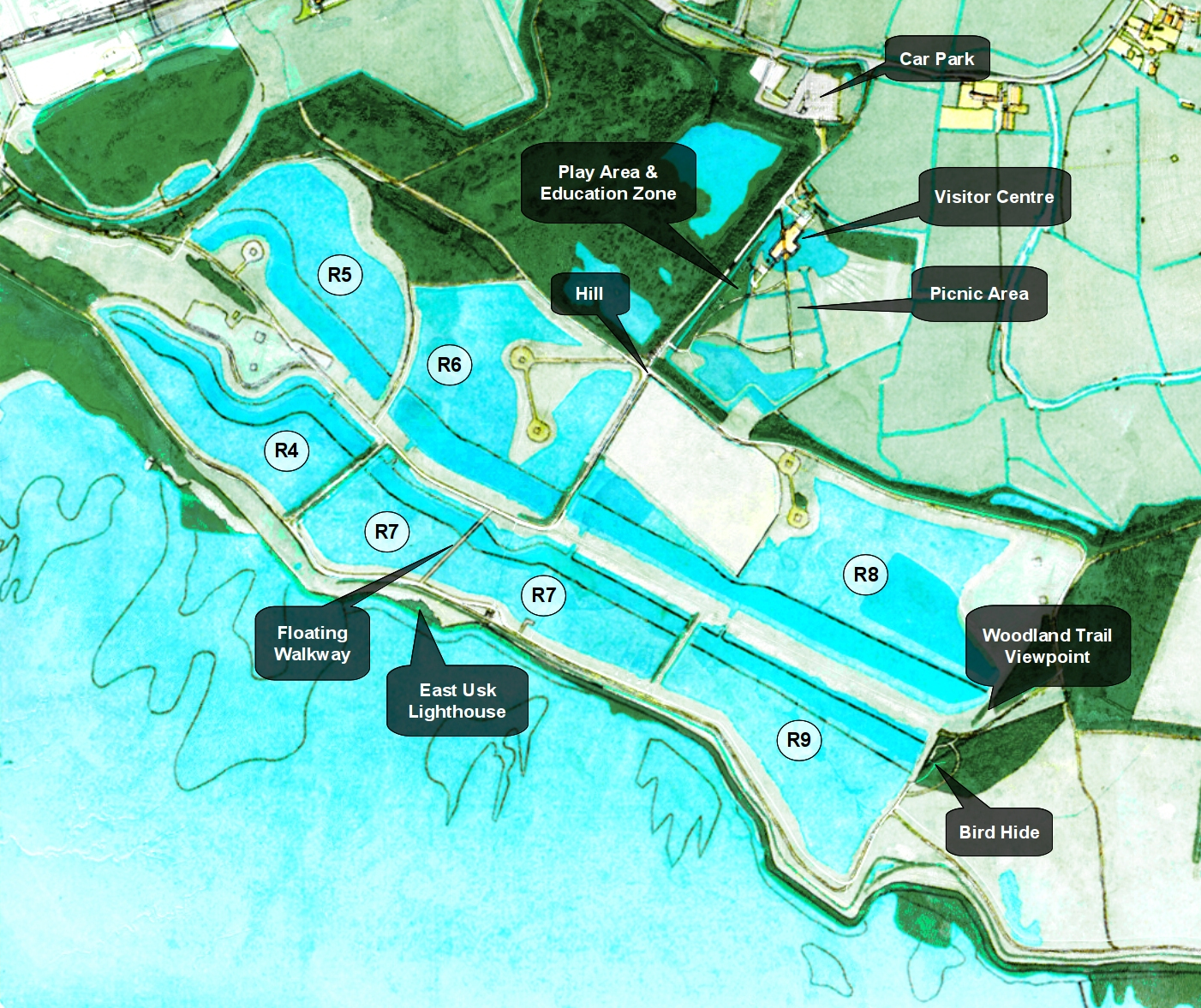
Map of Newport Wetlands RSPB Reserve

Entrance is free, with car parking facilities open every day of the year from 9:00 am until 5:00 pm. The visitor and education centre are open every day except Christmas Day. The visitor centre provides refreshments, bathroom facilities, viewing facilities and guided tours. The on-site shop closed in 2025. Dogs and cyclists are permitted outside the visitor centre and along a specially marked six-kilometre (3.7 mi) circular route around the reserve's perimeter which is accessed via a path next to the car park exit. Initially heading west, the route runs alongside the power station then turns to the east past the East Usk Lighthouse and along the Severn Estuary (Wales Coast Path). After dropping below the sea wall, the path splits, with a pedestrian and dog walking route returning to the visitor centre via a marked path to the left. A longer pedestrian and cycling route continues towards Goldcliff village and the local road network.

Next to the visitor centre is a picnic and play area, which provides a children's play area, education zone, and benches for picnics.

The far end of the main trail faces south towards the Severn Estuary, along which the East Usk Lighthouse and a bird hide overlooking lagoon R9 are situated. There is also a woodland trail, which is entered by turning left at the top of the hill. The trail passes neighbouring farmland, through the reserve's woodlands, past a lagoon viewing platform which overlooks lagoon R8, and onto the estuary trail.

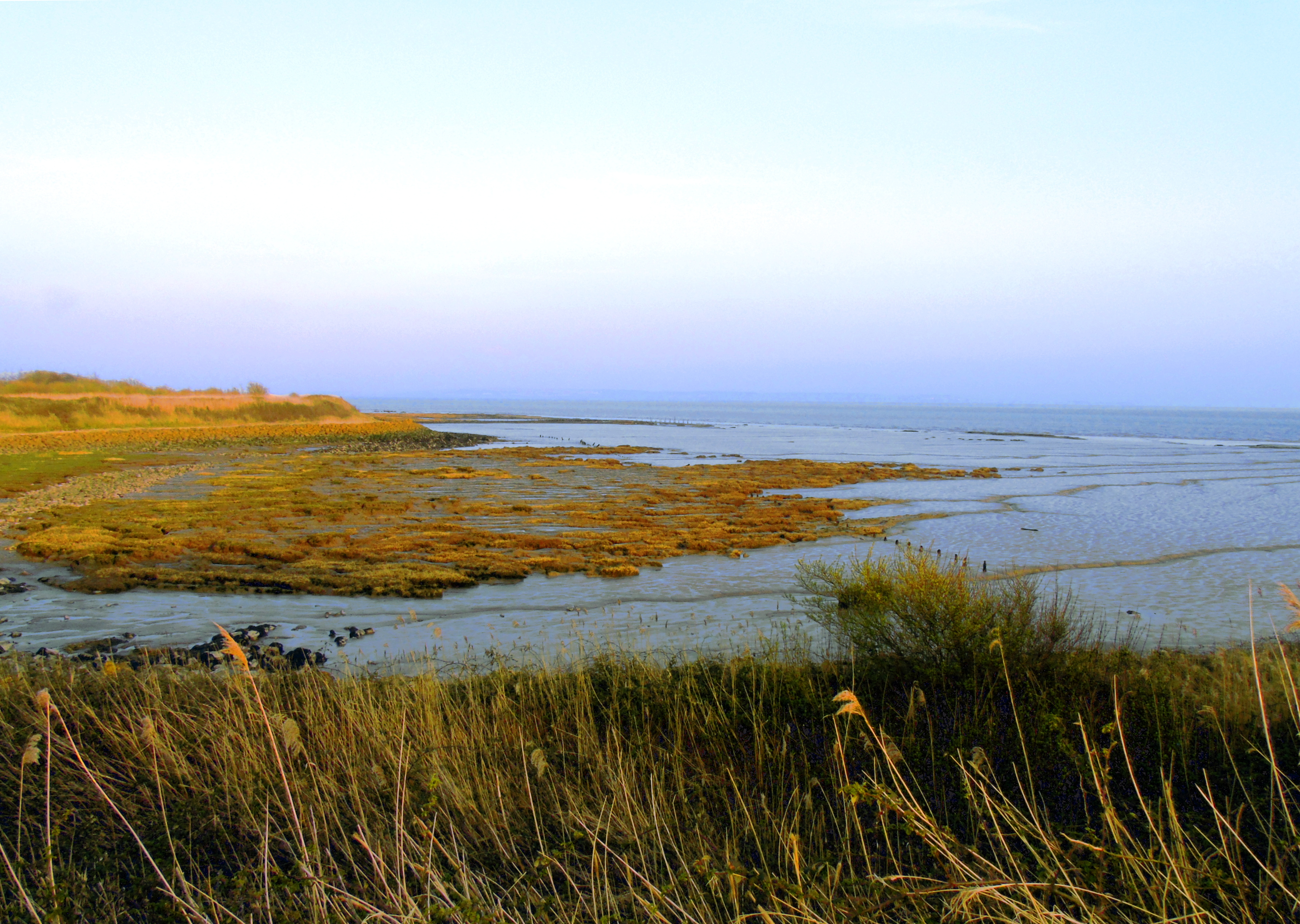
View of Severn Estuary Rocks From Newport Wetlands RSPB Reserve

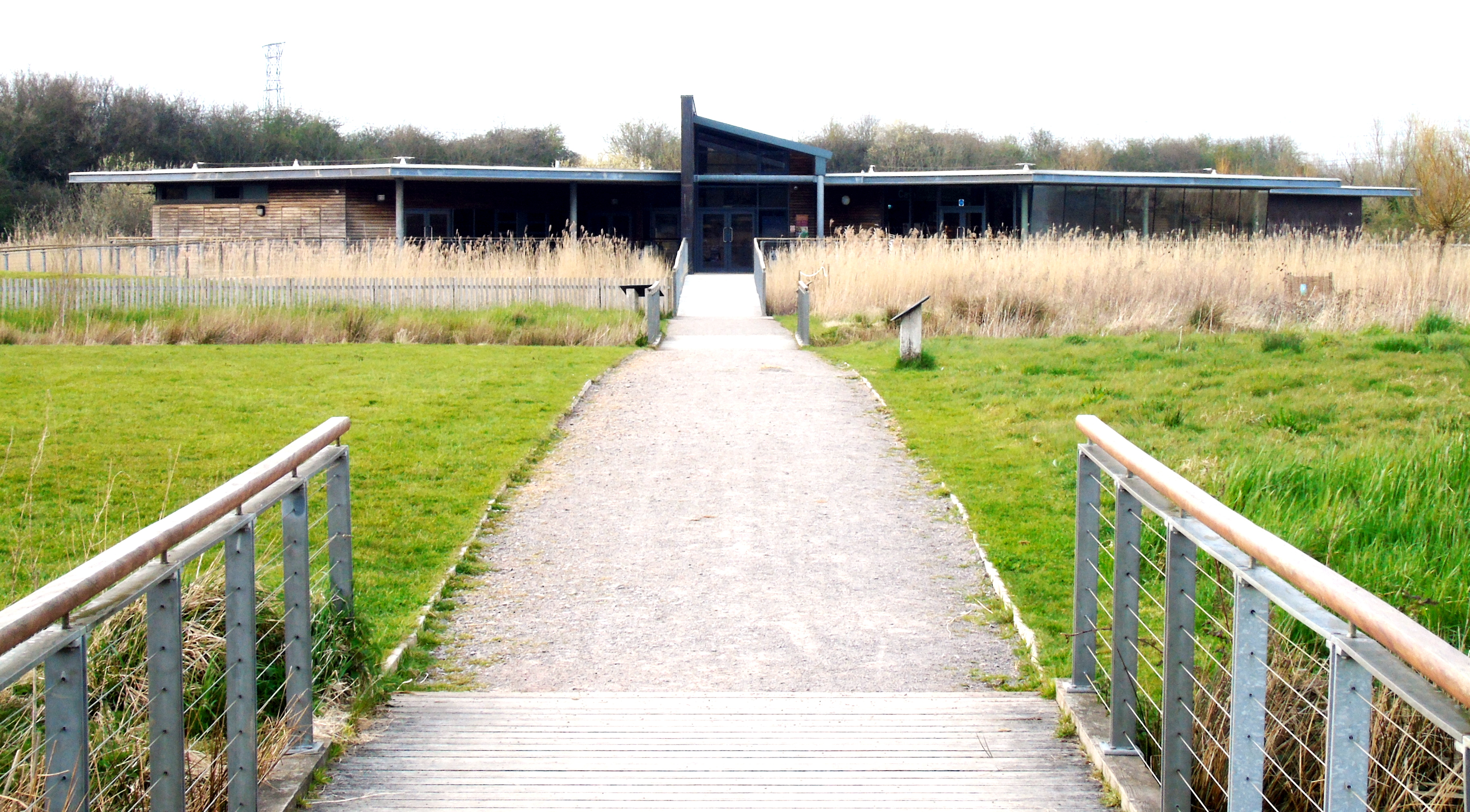
Newport Wetlands RSPB Reserve visitor centre as seen from picnic and play area

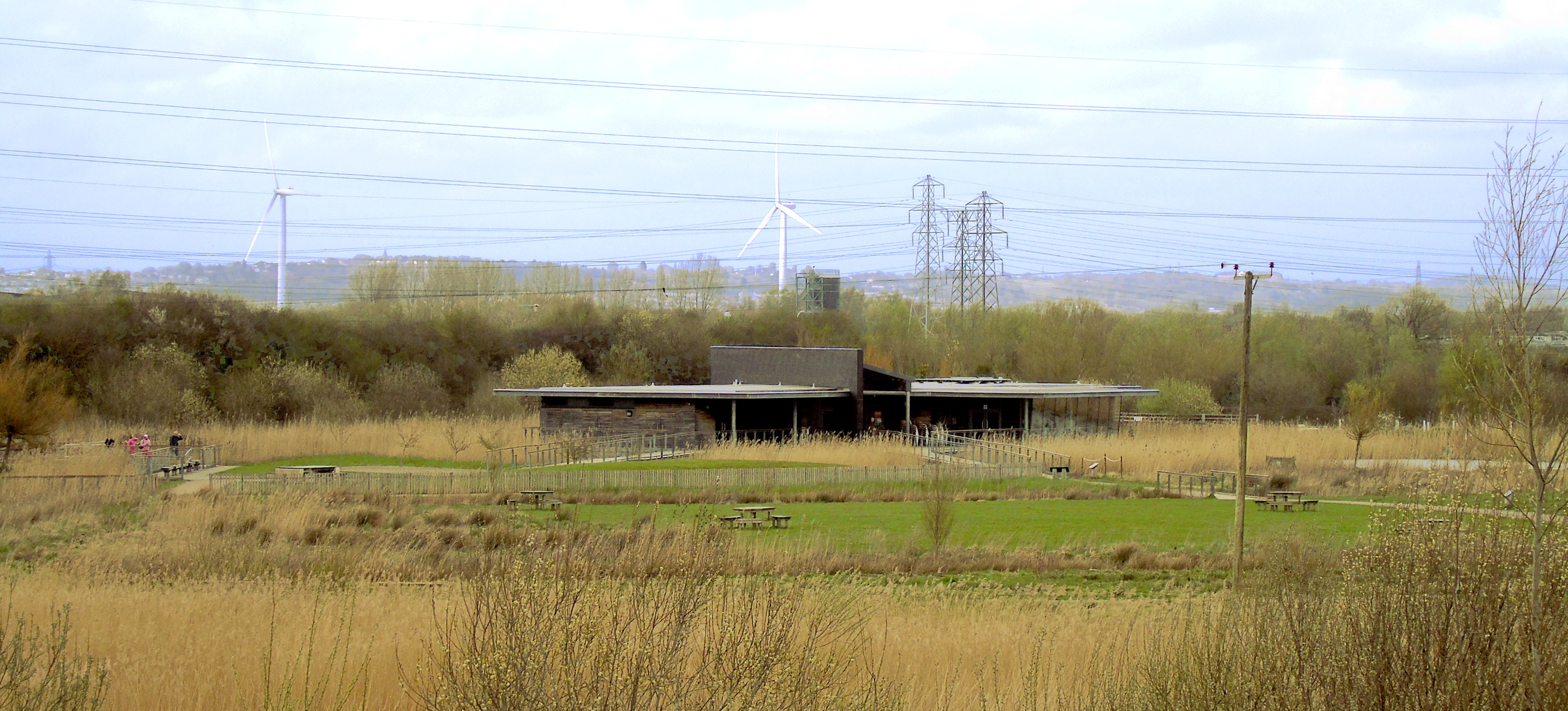
Visitor centre and picnic and play area seen from hill

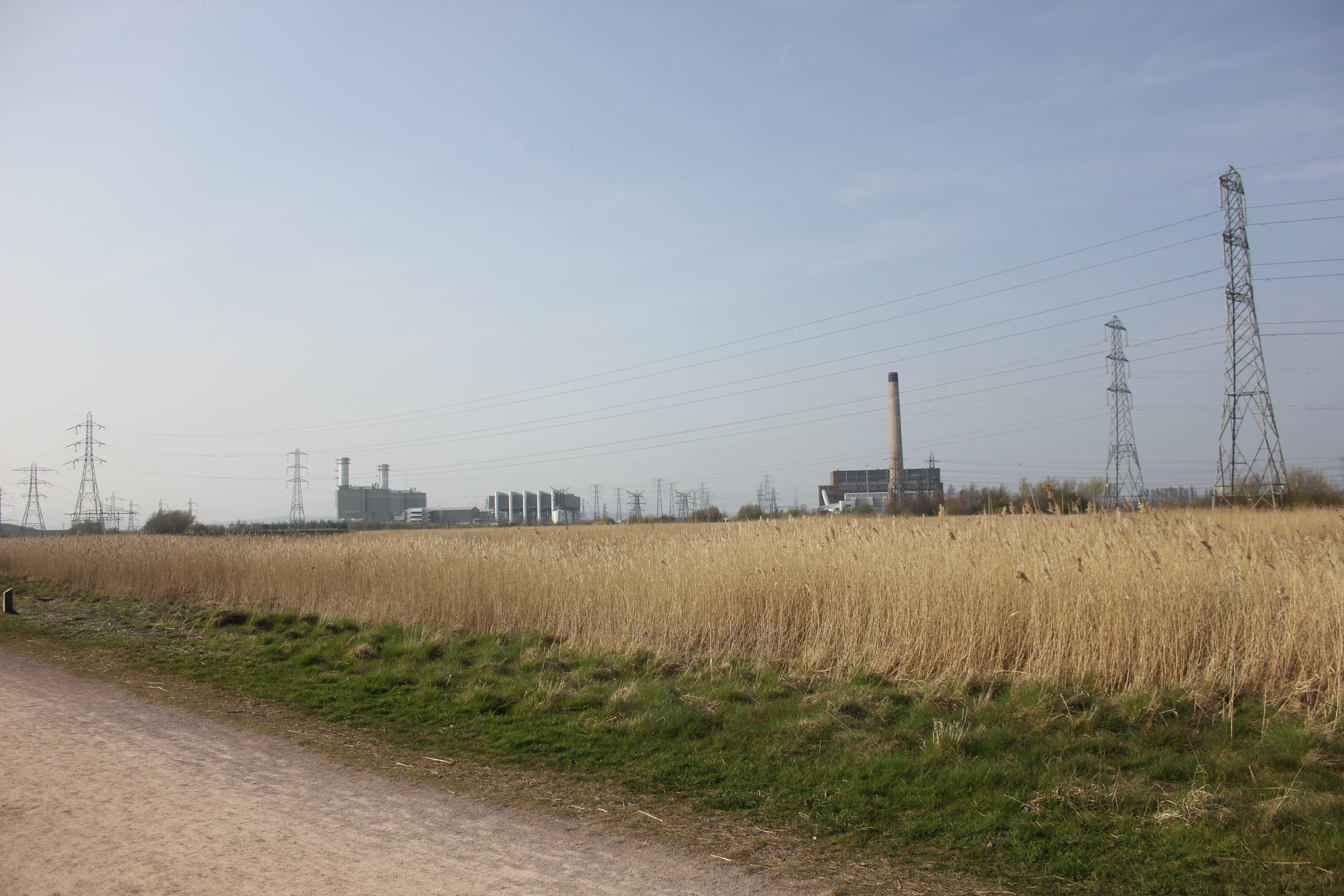
View of Uskmouth power station

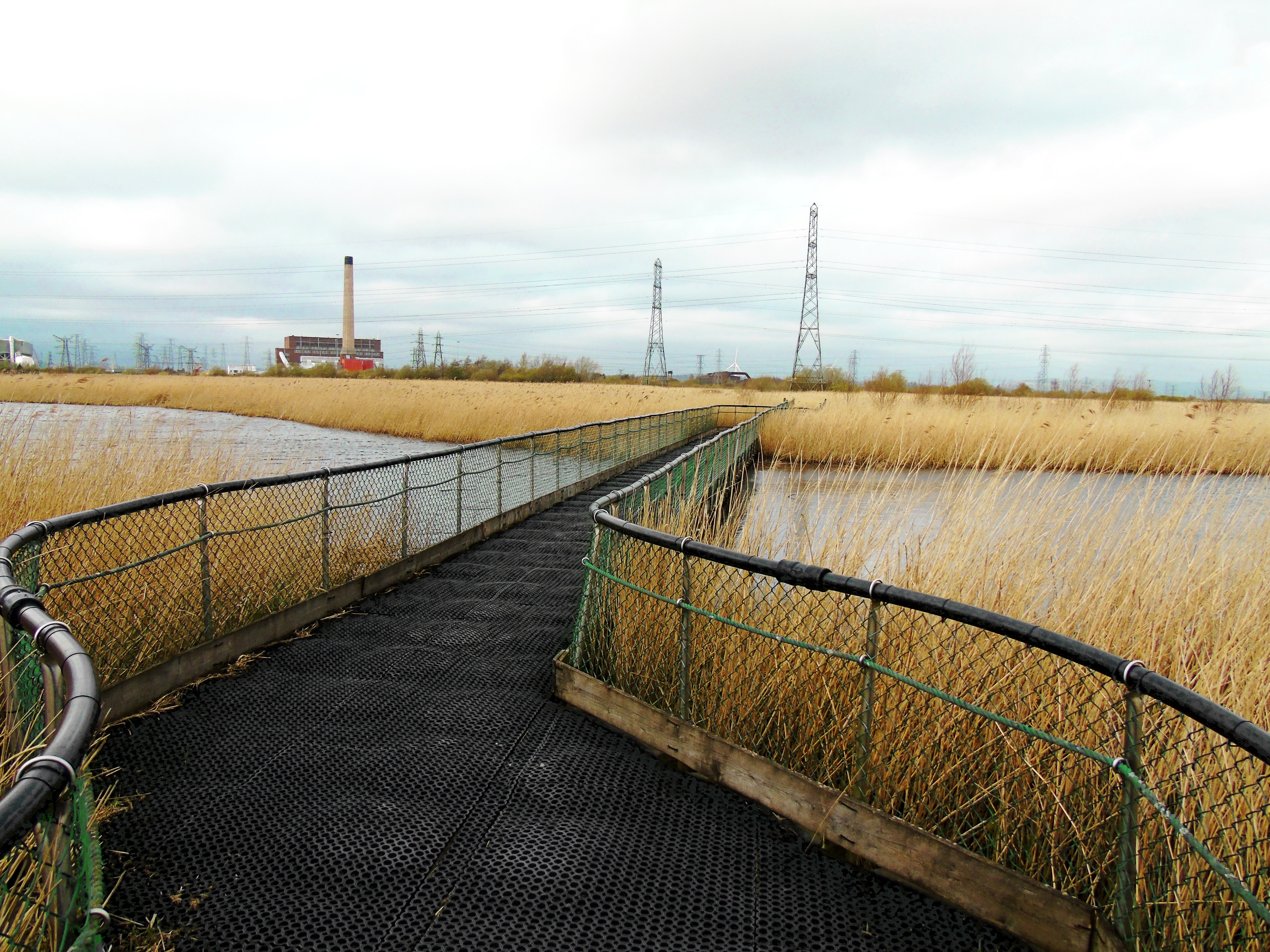
Floating walkway facing northwards

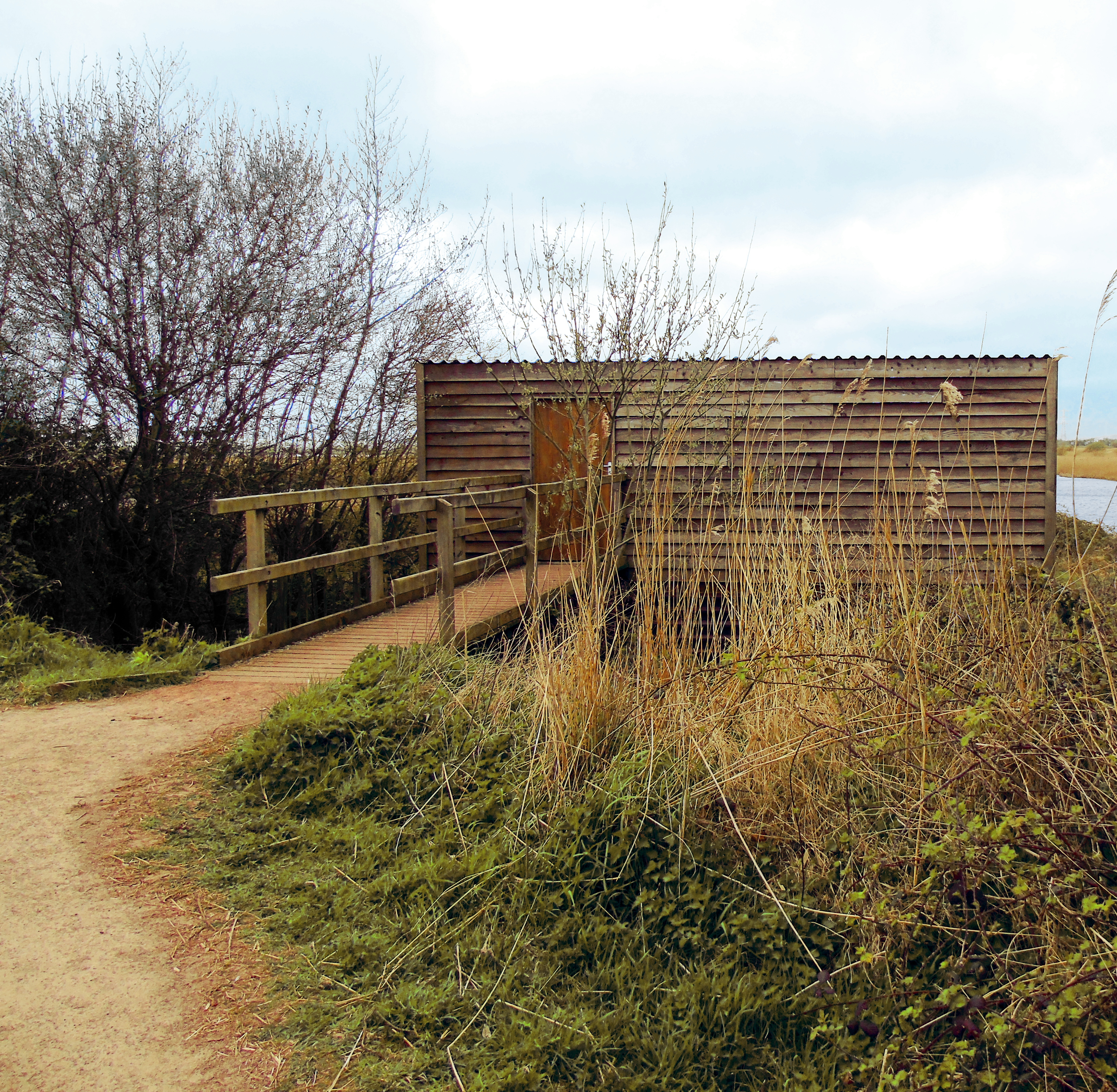
Entrance to the hide

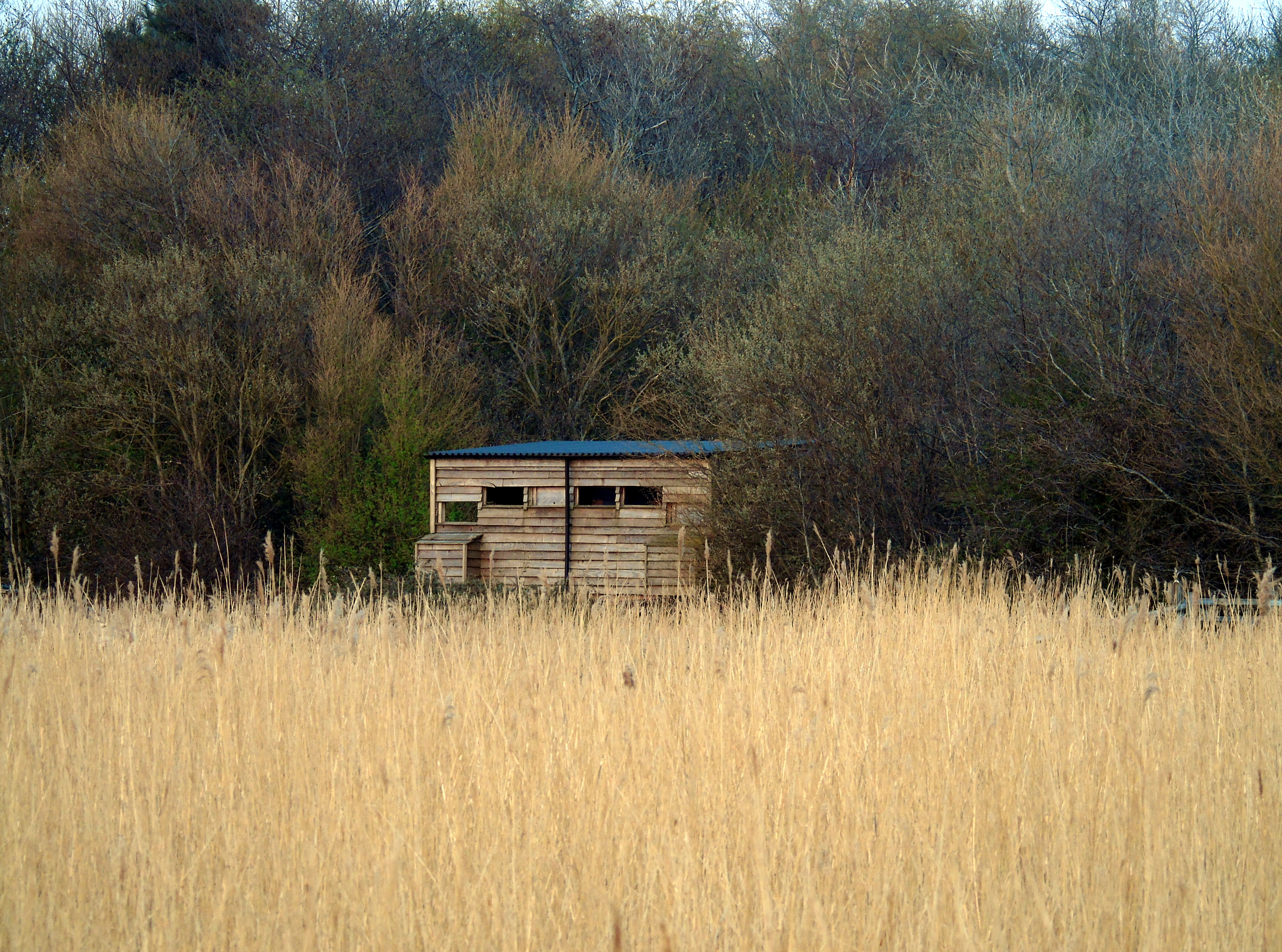
Frontal exterior to the hide

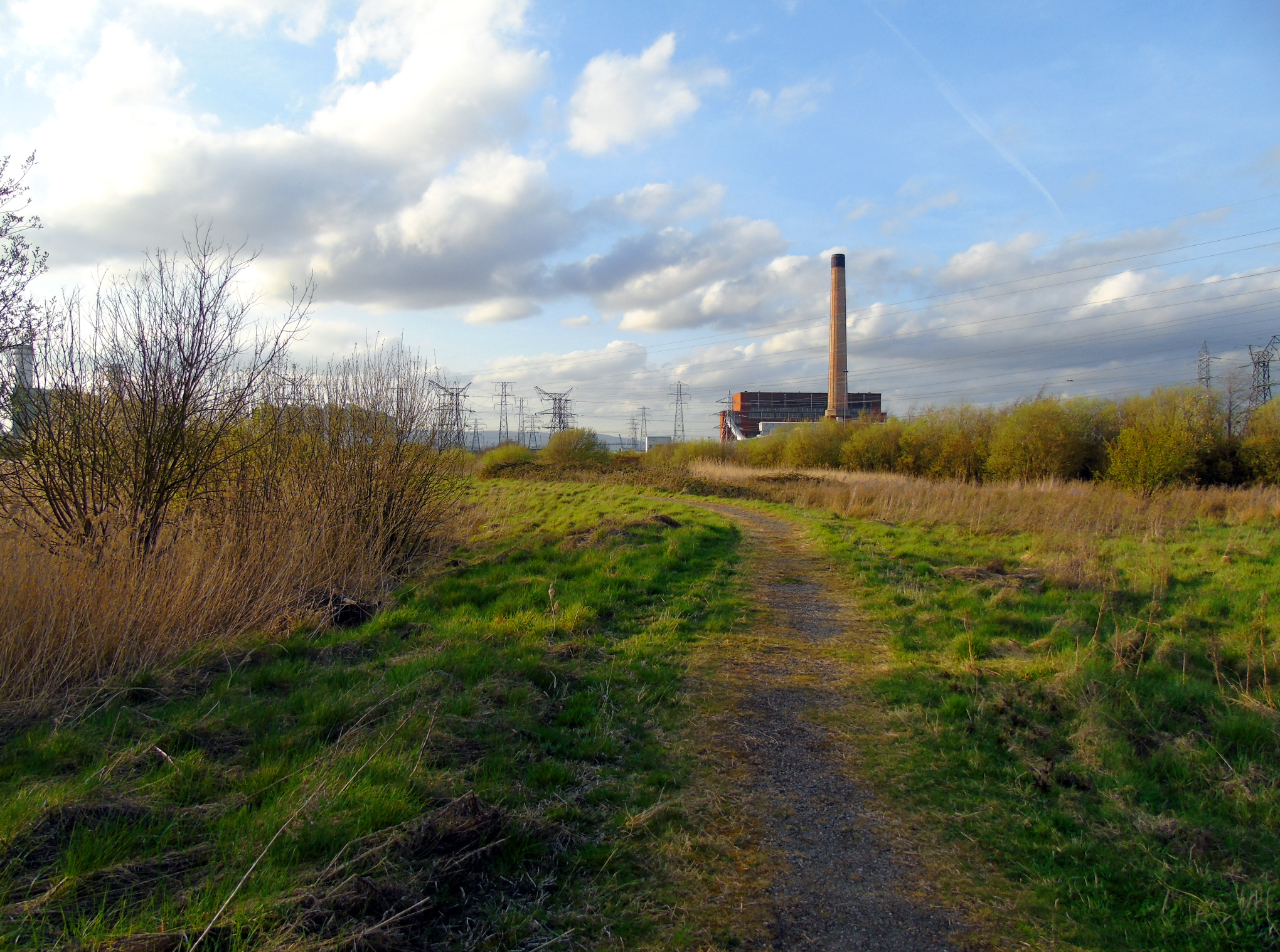
Cycle path alongside power station

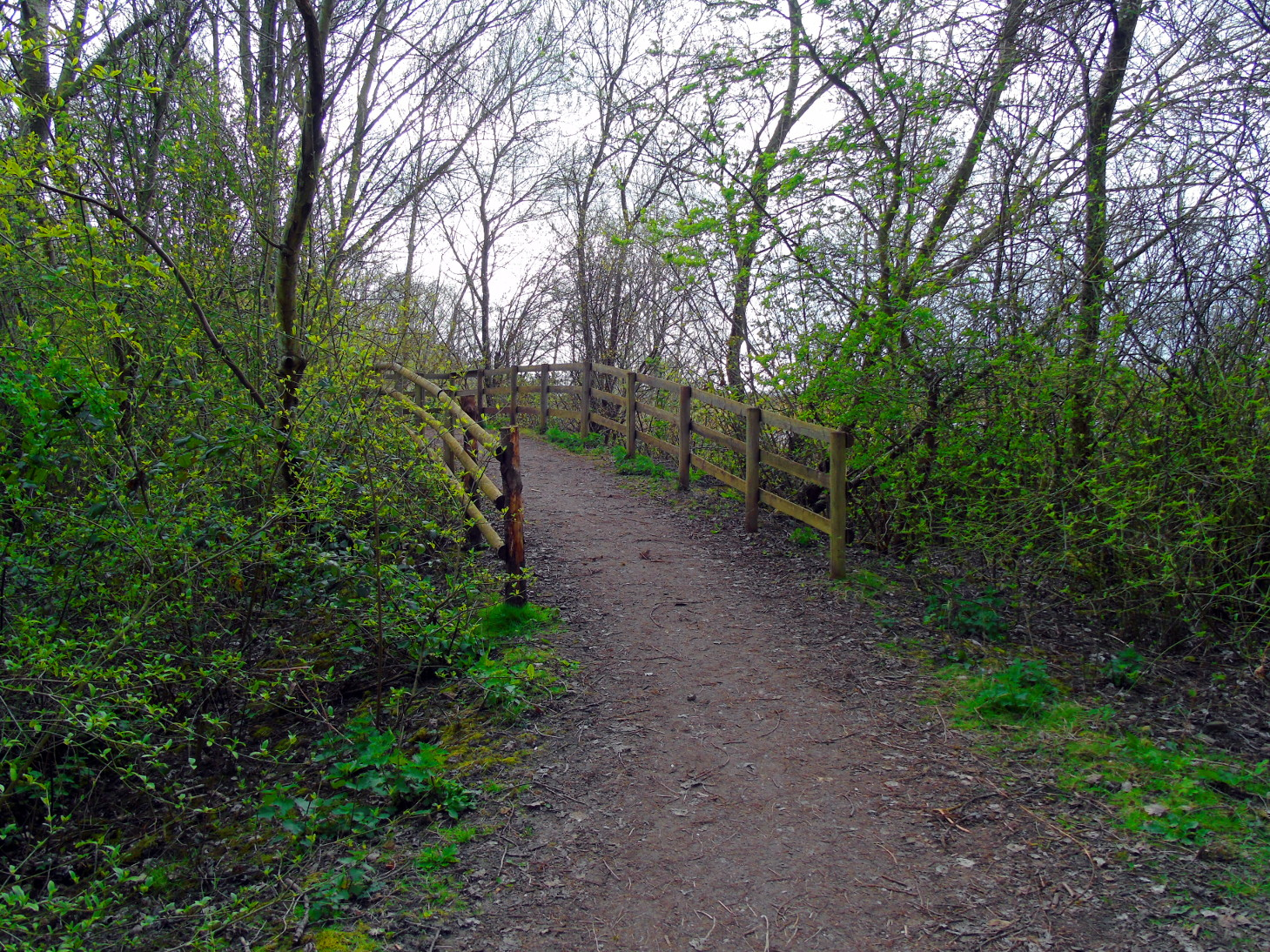
Viewing platform

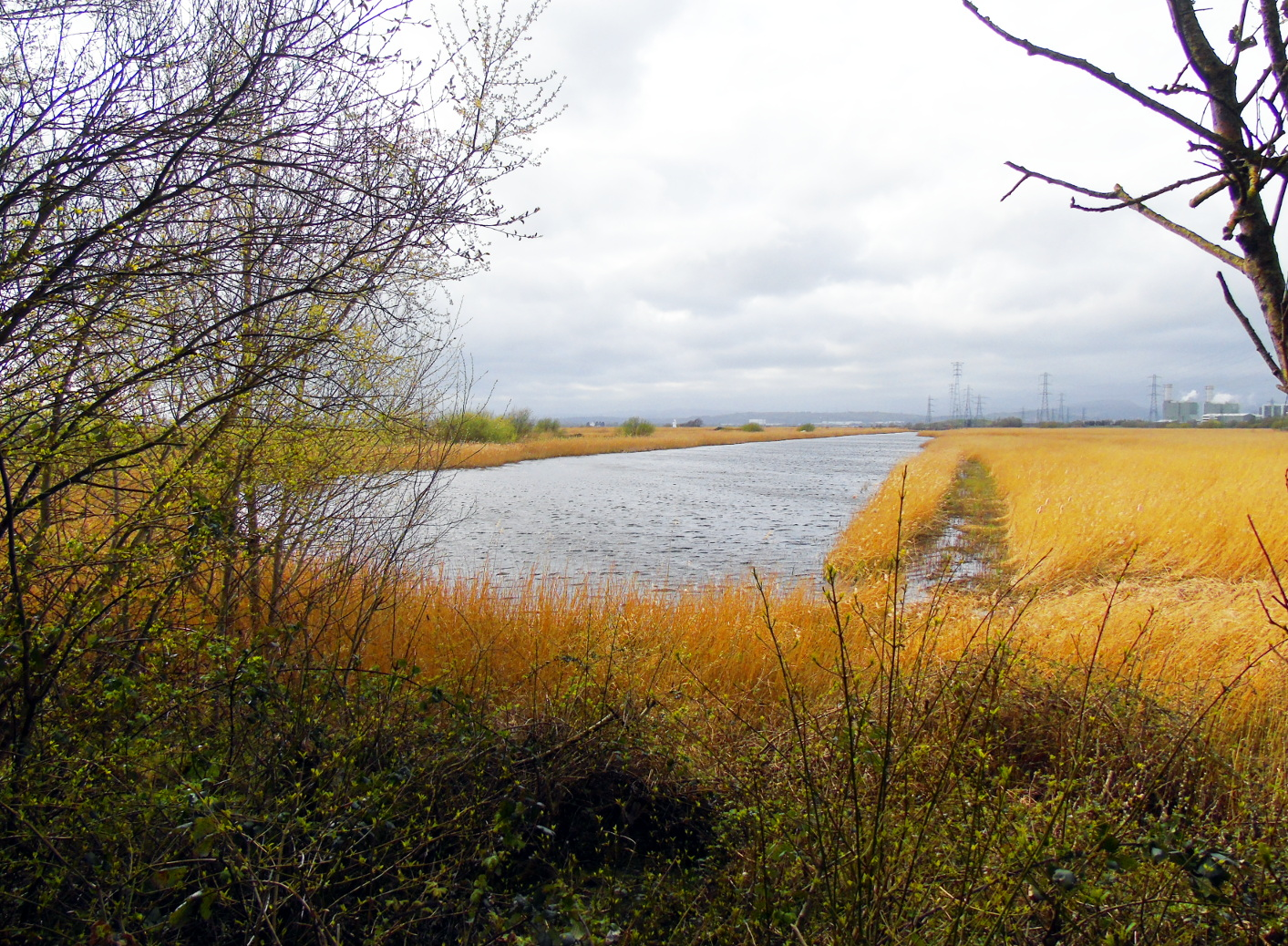
Lagoon R8 overlooked by viewing platform

== Flora and fauna ==
The reserve includes a wide variety of habitats which include grazed pasture with hedgerows, ditches, reens, reed beds and grasslands. These help to attract breeding birds such as lapwing, redshank, oystercatcher, little ringed plover and ringed plover, as well as visitors such as wigeon, northern shoveler, teal, shelduck and pintail, hen harrier and short-eared owl. In 2020, two pairs of bittern successfully bred at the site, for the first time in south Wales for over 200 years. The Goldcliff Lagoons, which form the eastern end of the reserve, is the only site in south Wales where avocet breed.

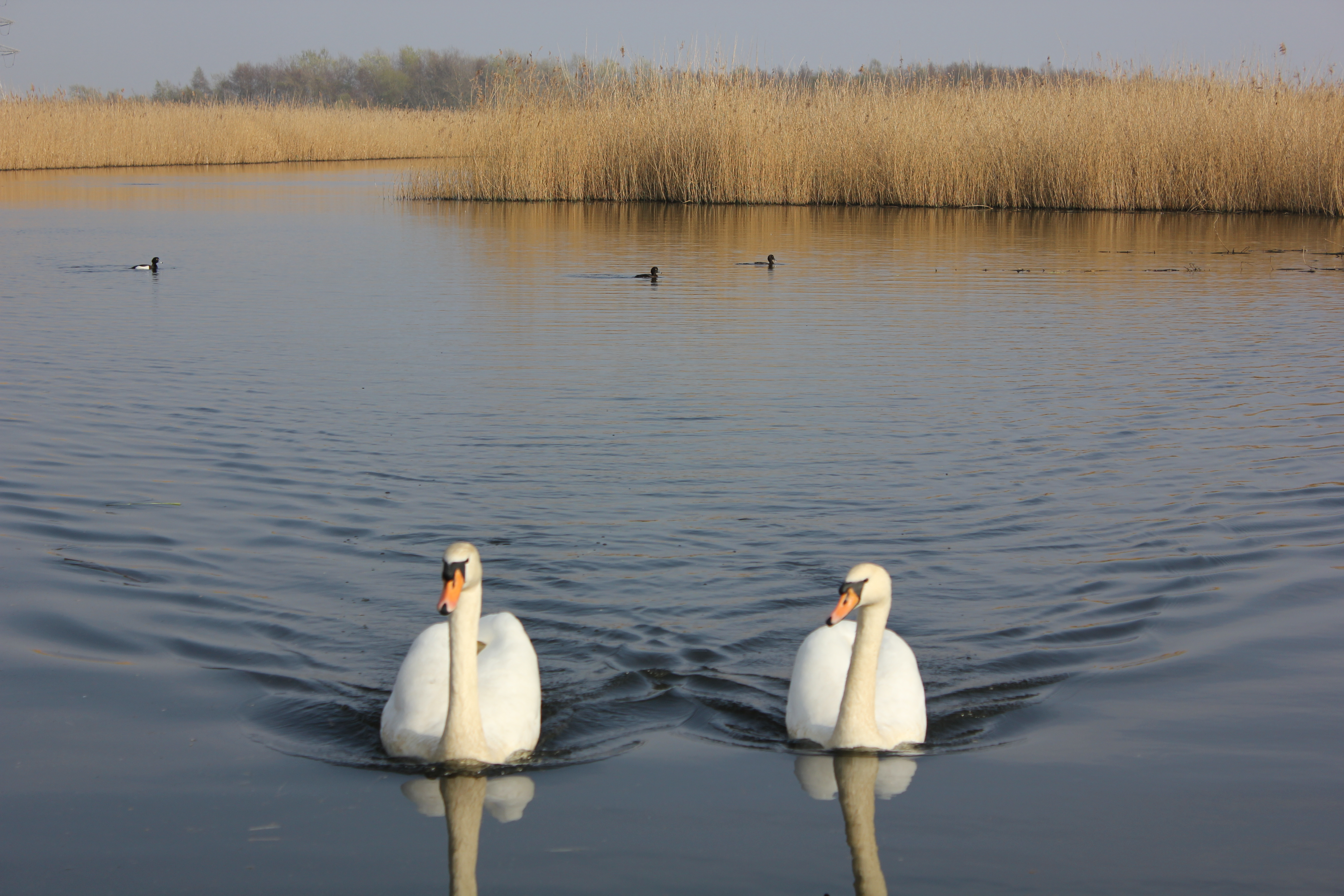
Mute swans with male and female tufted ducks in the background

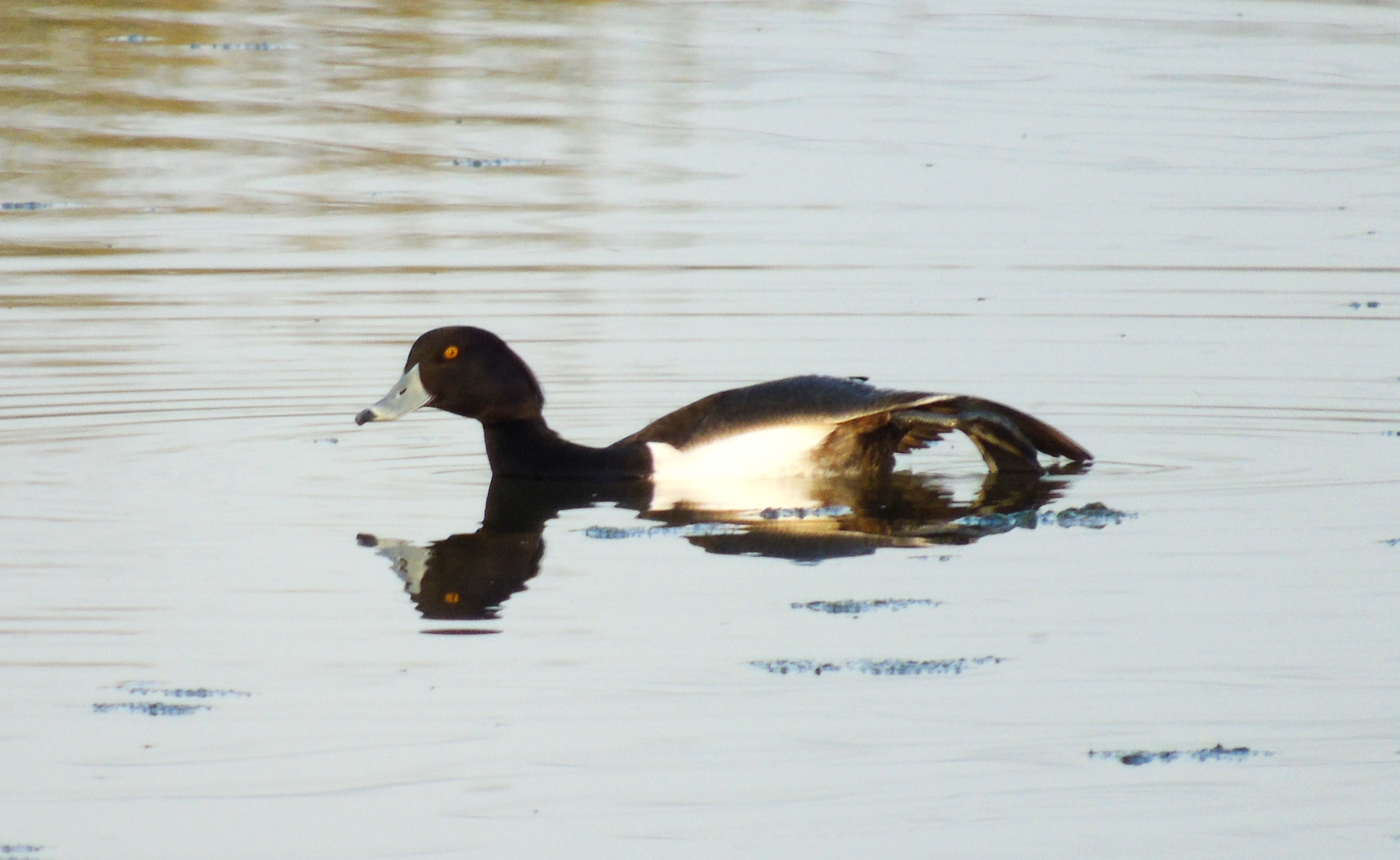
Tufted duck near Newport Wetlands RSPB Reserve visitor centre/picnic and play area

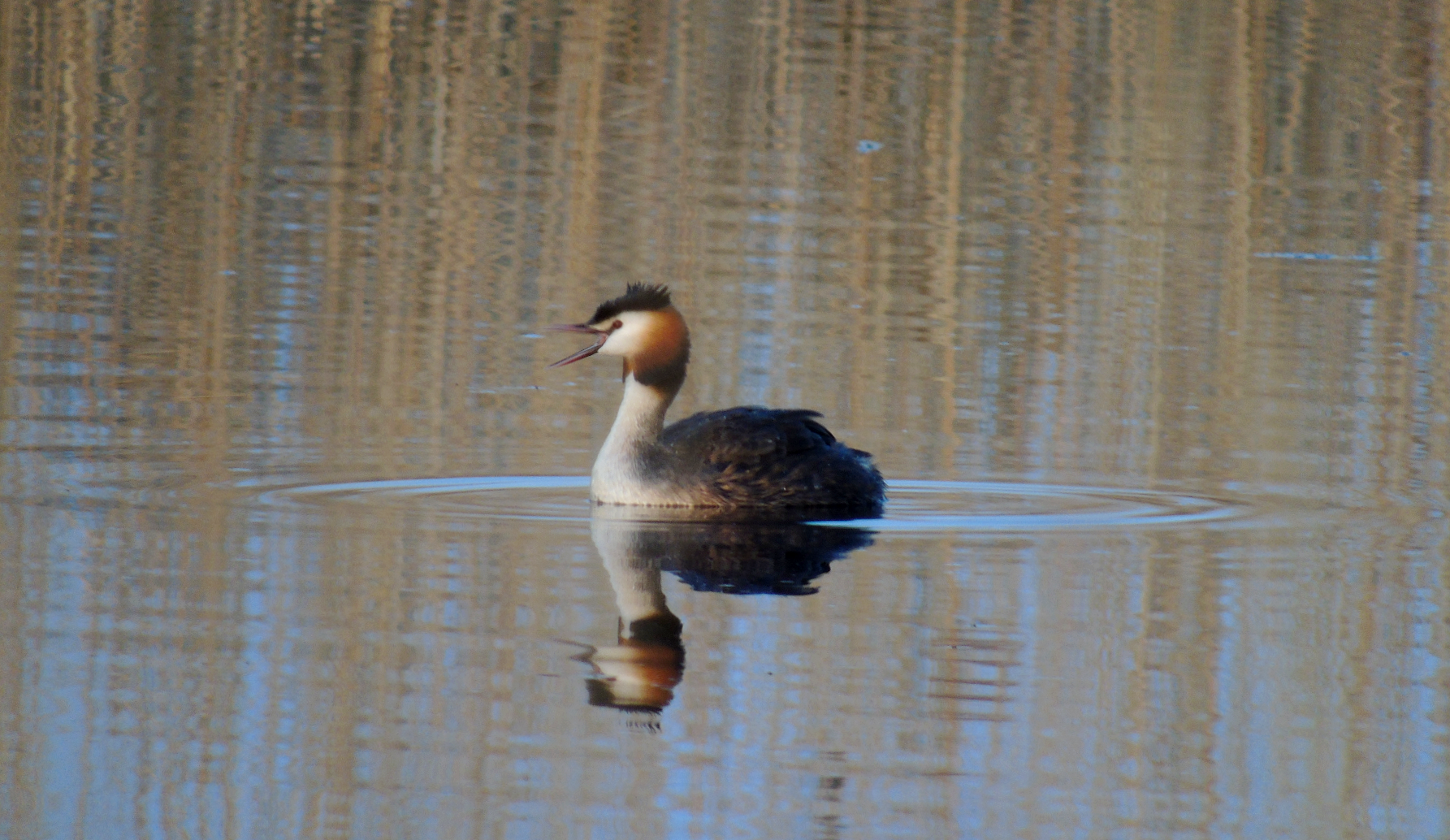
Great crested grebe calling on Newport Wetlands RSPB Reserve fenced lagoon

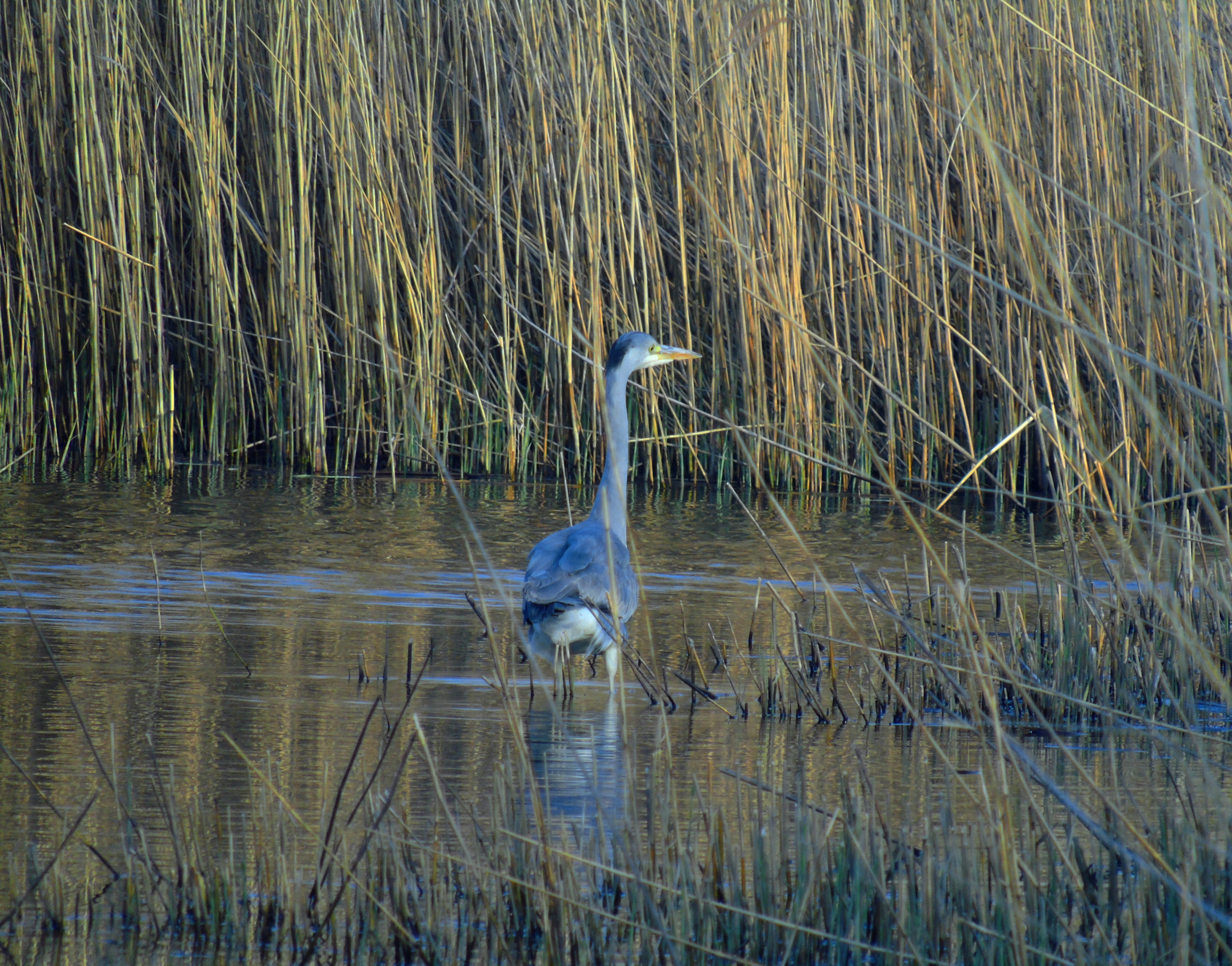
Grey heron fishing on Newport Wetlands RSPB Reserve fenced lagoon

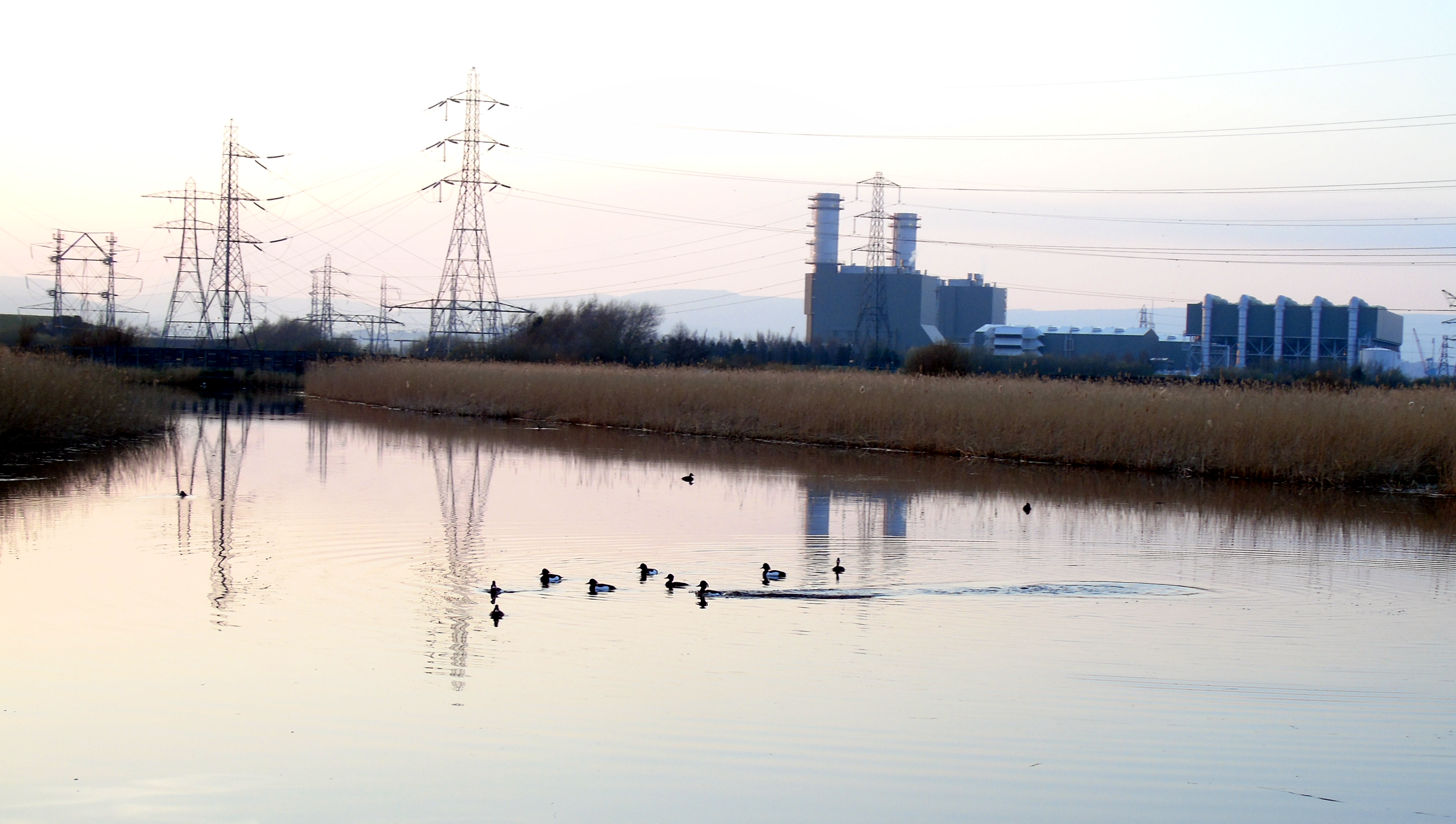
Tufted ducks at Newport Wetlands RSPB Reserve floating walkway

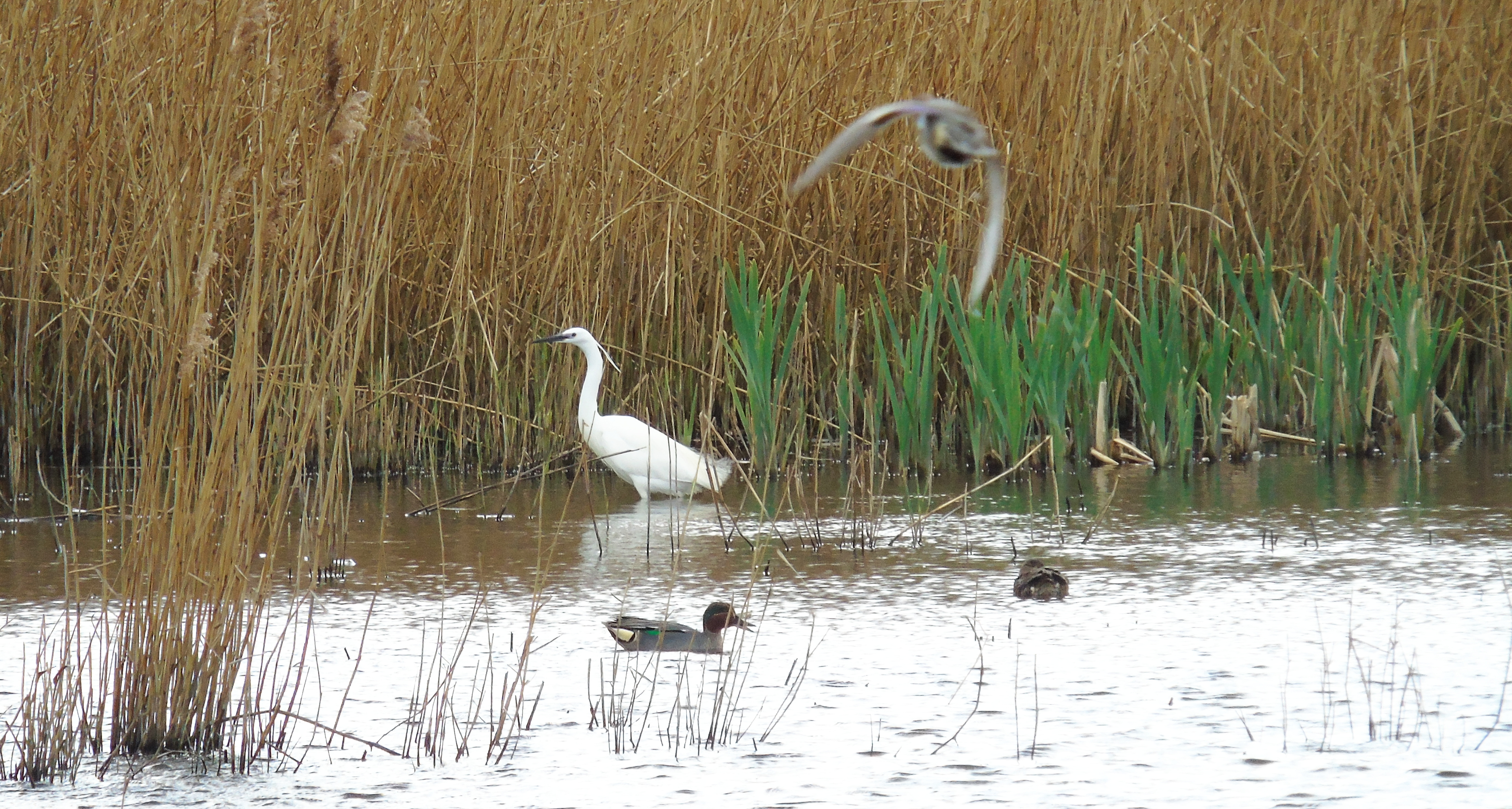
Little egret and teal ducks on Lagoon near the hide at Newport Wetlands RSPB Reserve

== Floating walkway ==
The reserve contains an artificial floating walkway, which provides a direct route to the lighthouse over lagoon R7. This lagoon is one of three lagoons spanning the coastal path (east to west). The most easterly lagoon (R9) is overlooked by a bird hide in addition to being viewable from a fenced overpass, and the most westerly lagoon (R4) is viewable from a fenced overpass.

== East Usk Lighthouse ==
East Usk Lighthouse
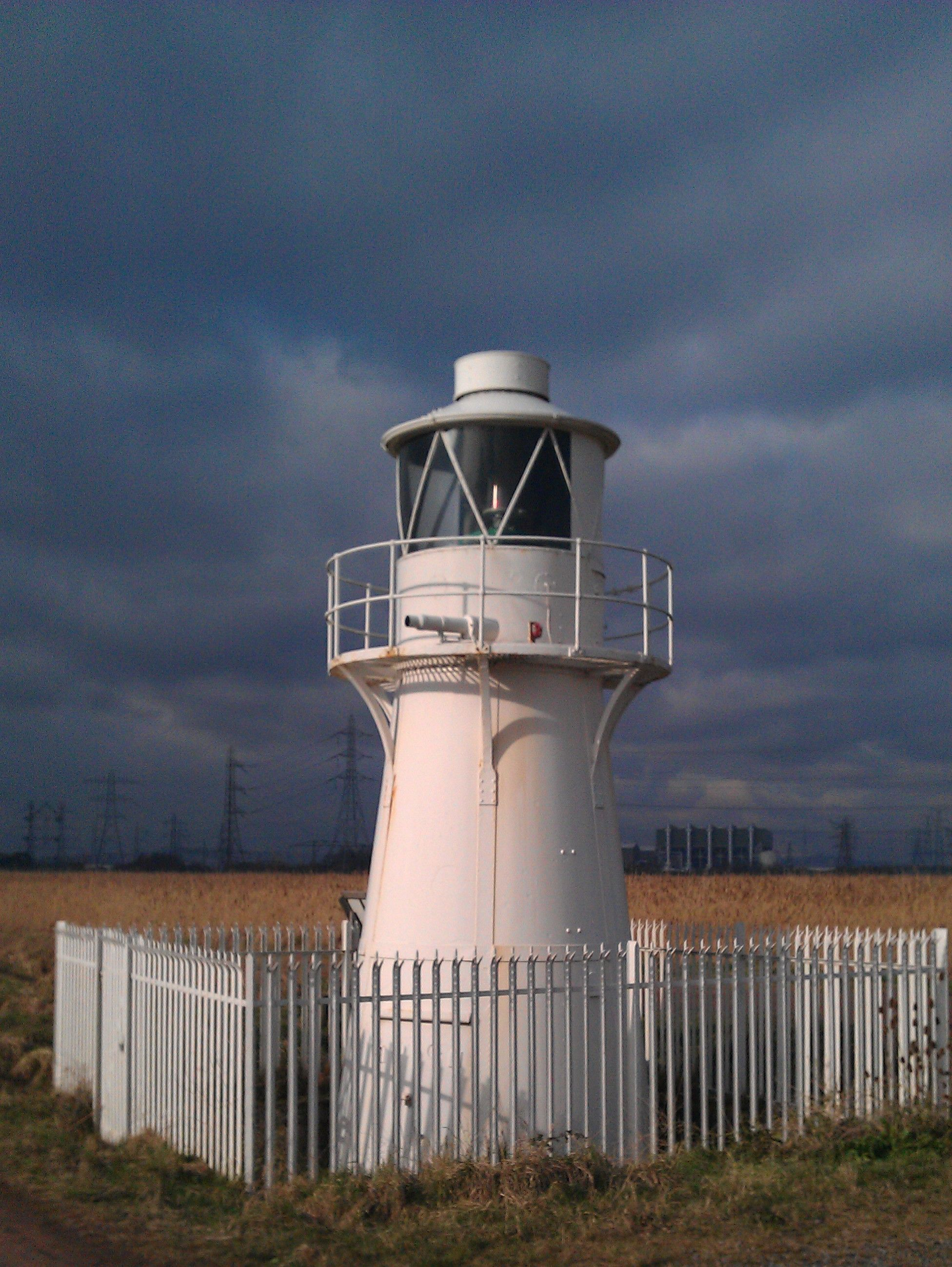
- East Usk lighthouse, near Perry Lane, West Nash, Newport
- Location: Uskmouth; Newport; Wales; United Kingdom
- Coordinates: 51°32′24″N 2°58′01″W

Tower
- Constructed: 1893
- Construction: cast iron tower
- Height: 13 metres (43 ft)
- Shape: cylindrical tower with balcony and lantern
- Markings: white tower and lantern
- Power source: mains electricity
- Operator: Newport Harbour Commissioners

Light
- Focal height: 11 metres (36 ft)
- Range: 11 nmi (20 km; 13 mi) (white), 10 nmi (19 km; 12 mi) (red, green)
- Characteristic: Fl (2) WRG 10s.

The East Usk Lighthouse is within the reserve on the estuary trail facing towards the Severn Estuary. It is a basic lamphousing with no accommodation. The more substantial decommissioned West Usk Lighthouse, currently operating as a hotel, is on the opposite (west) bank of the River Usk and can be viewed from the reserve. It was constructed in 1893 by Trinity House and entered service on or about 22 June that year.

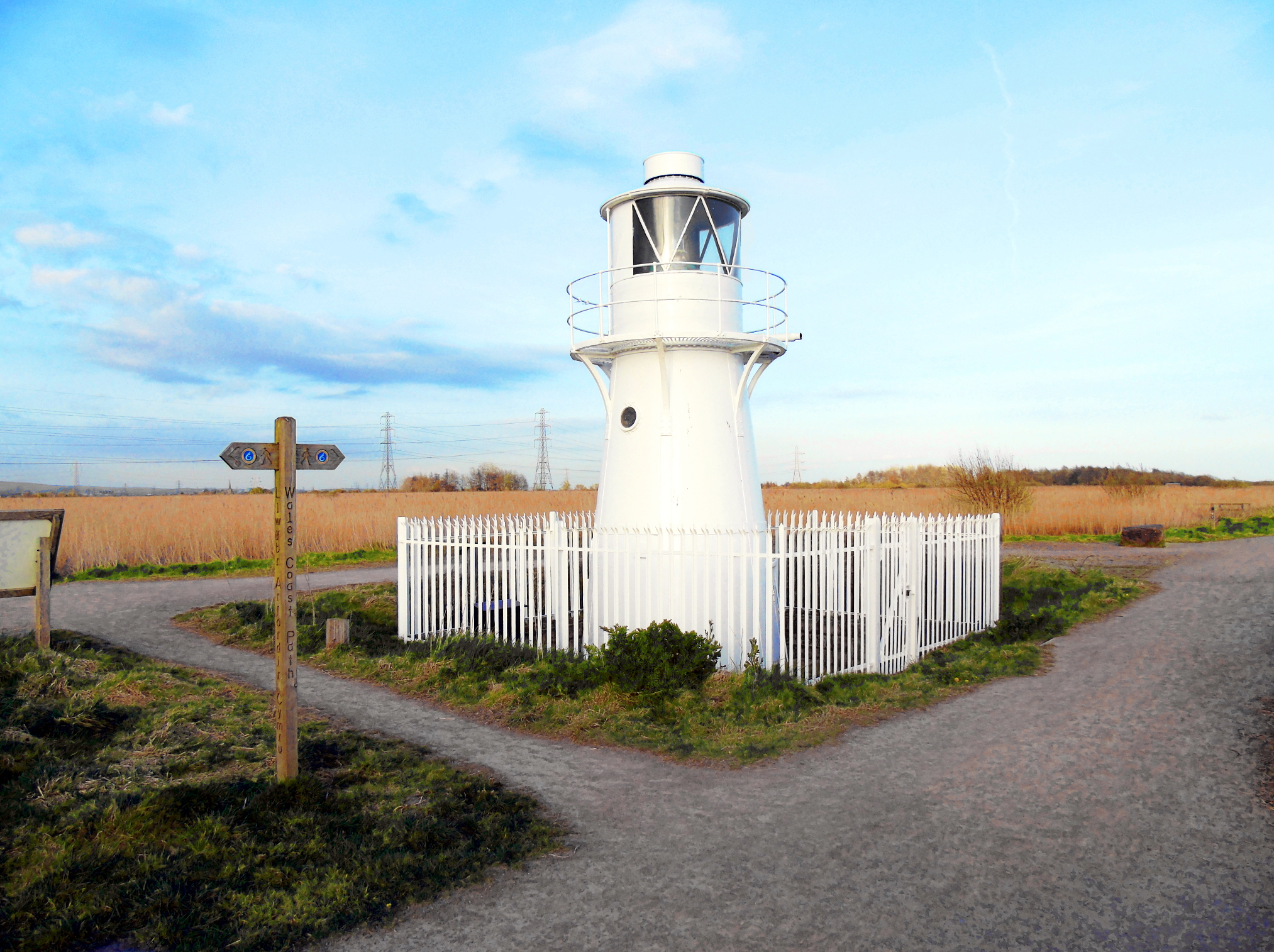
East Usk Lighthouse at Newport Wetlands RSPB Nature Reserve facing east towards bird hide

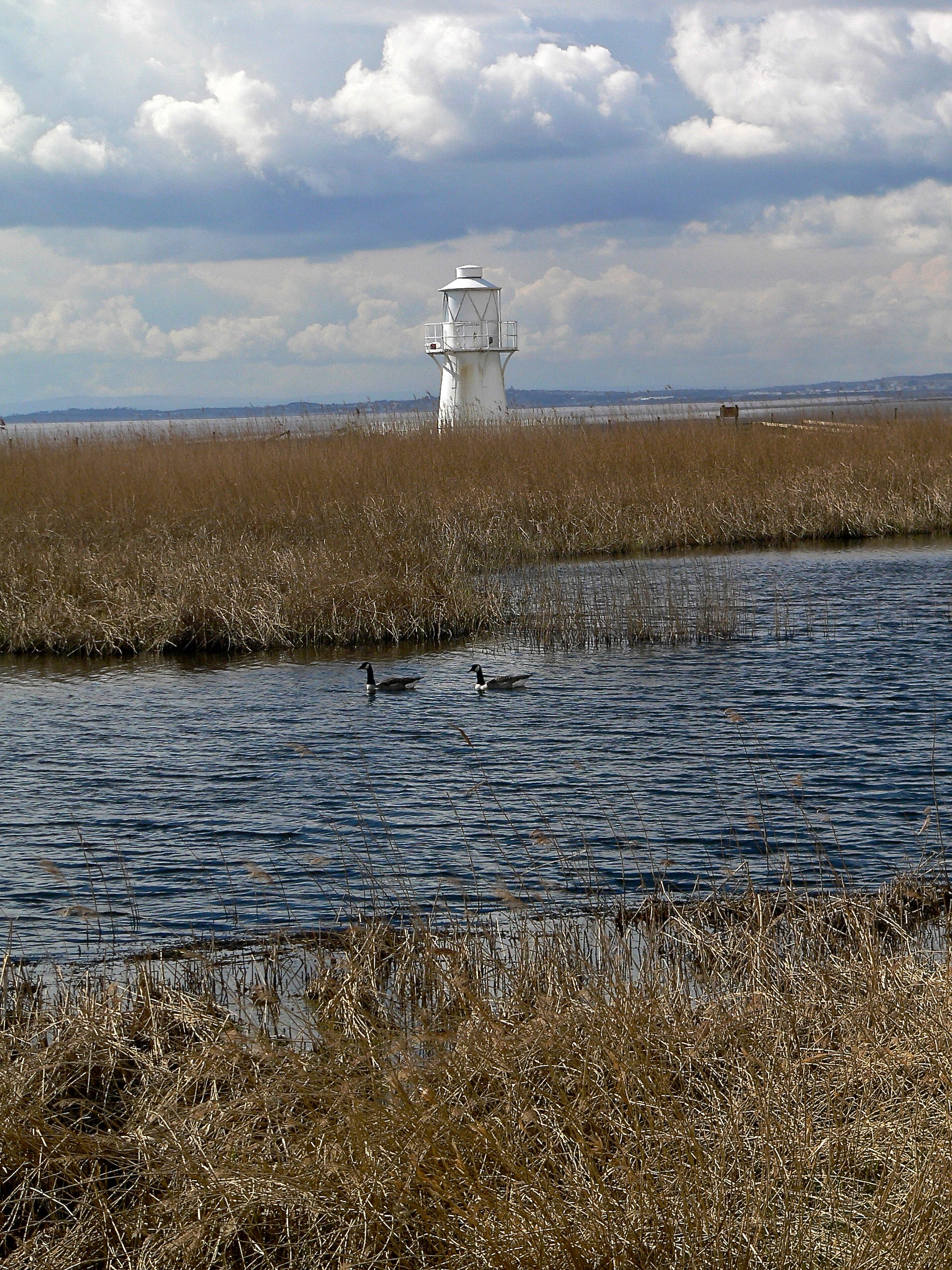
Navigation Beacon Newport Wetlands
