= Caldicot and Wentloog Levels =

Coastal plain and wetlands in Monmouthshire, Wales

Coordinates: 51°34′12″N 2°49′30″W

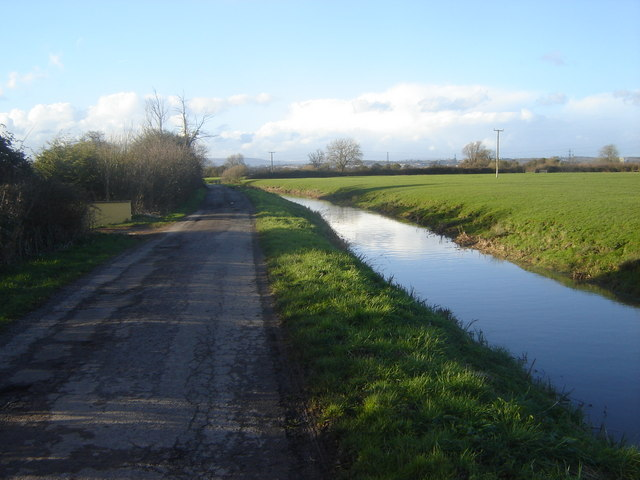
A reen in Goldcliff on the Caldicot Level

The Caldicot and Wentloog Levels are two areas of low-lying estuarine alluvial wetland and intertidal mudflats adjoining the north bank of the Severn Estuary, either side of the River Usk estuary near Newport in south east Wales. They are also known collectively as the Monmouthshire Levels or Gwent Levels, and the name Wentloog is sometimes spelled Wentlooge in official publications.

The Caldicot Level lies to the southeast of Newport between the River Usk and River Wye and consists of 17,500 acres (71 km^{2}). It is home to Newport Wetlands Reserve. The Wentloog Level lies to the southwest between the River Usk and Rhymney River and consists of 8,500 acres (34 km^{2}). They are an agricultural region interspersed with suburban development.

The levels are formed from tidal deposits and alluvium, which have been recurrently inundated and reclaimed from the Severn Estuary by humans since Roman times. They have been patterns of settlement, enclosure and drainage systems belonging to successive periods of use, and are extremely rich archaeologically, with finds from the Mesolithic, Bronze Age and Iron Age periods.

They are an important wetland resource. Parts have been designated as Sites of Special Scientific Interest. They are registered as a Landscape of Outstanding Historic Interest in Wales.

== History and archaeology ==
There have been variations in both land and sea levels in the Severn Estuary since the start of human habitation in the area. The Levels have been reclaimed from the sea at different times during the historic period, preserving evidence of patterns of settlement, enclosure and drainage systems. Mesolithic and later remains have been discovered at Goldcliff, and late Mesolithic human footprints at Uskmouth.

One of the most significant finds was of a 3rd-century Romano-British boat found at Wilcrick near Magor. The Romans occupied the area from the 2nd to the 4th centuries. In 1878, a boundary stone marking the building of 33 paces of embankment by Roman soldiers was discovered at Goldcliff. Research suggests that, initially, reclamation of the natural salt marsh for farmland began at a few "island" sites within the marshes, such as at Nash and Redwick, before a sea wall was built along the whole coast.

Goldcliff Priory was established in 1113 and together with other major landowners took responsibility for further drainage work in the area. Settlements became established, linked by droveways such as the Whitewall at Magor, and land was gradually reclaimed for pasture and arable use. A large number of Anglo-Norman sites including castles, churches, court houses, manor houses, moated sites and watermills show near-continuous occupation throughout the Middle Ages.

The Bristol Channel floods of 30 January 1607 (New style), caused by either a storm surge or a tsunami, resulted in the drowning of an estimated 2,000 people, with houses and villages swept away, an estimated 200 square miles (518 km^{2}) of farmland inundated and livestock destroyed. This was one of the worst natural disasters recorded in Britain.

== Drainage and management ==
Most of the levels has been the subject of artificial drainage schemes, and the area is criss-crossed by drainage channels, known locally as 'reens'. Many of these are now managed by the Caldicot and Wentlooge Levels Internal Drainage Board.

Caldicot and Wentlooge Level Act 1884
- Act of Parliament
- Parliament of the United Kingdom
- Long title: An Act to provide for the Commutation of the Liability of Landowners in the Levels of the Hundreds of Caldicot and Wentlooge in the County of Monmouth to maintain Seawalls and other Works and to provide for the making and maintaining of Roads in the said Levels and for other Purposes.
- Citation: 47 & 48 Vict. c. cxxxiii

Dates
- Royal assent: 14 July 1884

Text of statute as originally enacted

In 1531, Henry VIII set up courts of sewers to improve drainage, but without any powers to oblige landowners to carry out work. In 1828 the Commissioners for Sewers ordered a series of maps of the Caldicot and Wentloog Levels from Thomas Morris, a surveyor based in Newport. The Caldicot and Wentlooge Level Act 1884 (47 & 48 Vict. c. cxxxiii) established a new body, the Monmouthshire Commissioners of Sewers, with responsibility for maintaining sea walls and roads in the Levels. The long title of the act is "An Act to provide for the commutation of the liability of Landowners in the Levels of the hundreds of Caldicot and Wentlooge in the County of Monmouth to maintain sea walls and other works to provide for the making and maintaining of roads in the said Levels and for other purposes."

This was superseded in 1942 by the Caldicot and Wentlooge Levels Drainage Board, now the Caldicot and Wentlooge Levels Internal Drainage Board or IDB. In 2012, the IDB was criticised in a report by the Wales Audit Office for overpaying staff, paying for trips abroad for its members, and acting unlawfully on other occasions. The IDB accepted the report and stated that the organisation's management had changed substantially since the time of the offences. Newport West MP Paul Flynn called for further police investigation into what had happened.

The pattern of ditches now found on the Caldicot Level has been complicated by the construction of the Newport Wetlands Reserve. Whereas the raison d'etre of all previous reens and ditches had been to drain the land, the aim of the network of new waterways constructed as part of the reserve has been to keep the land flooded, albeit with fresh water.

== Ecology ==
The levels support the following rare species:

- Variable damselfly (Coenagrion pulchellum)
- Flowering rush (Butomus umbellatus) – an unusual water-edge plant with sprays of pink flowers in May and June
- Northern lapwing (Vanellus vanellus)
- Musk beetle (Aromia moschata) – a smelly longhorn beetle with shiny metallic green armour, that lives in willows along the reens
- Great silver water beetle (Hydrophilus piceus) – Britain's biggest beetle ignoring the Stag beetle's extra length due to antlers
- Water vole (Arvicola terrestris)
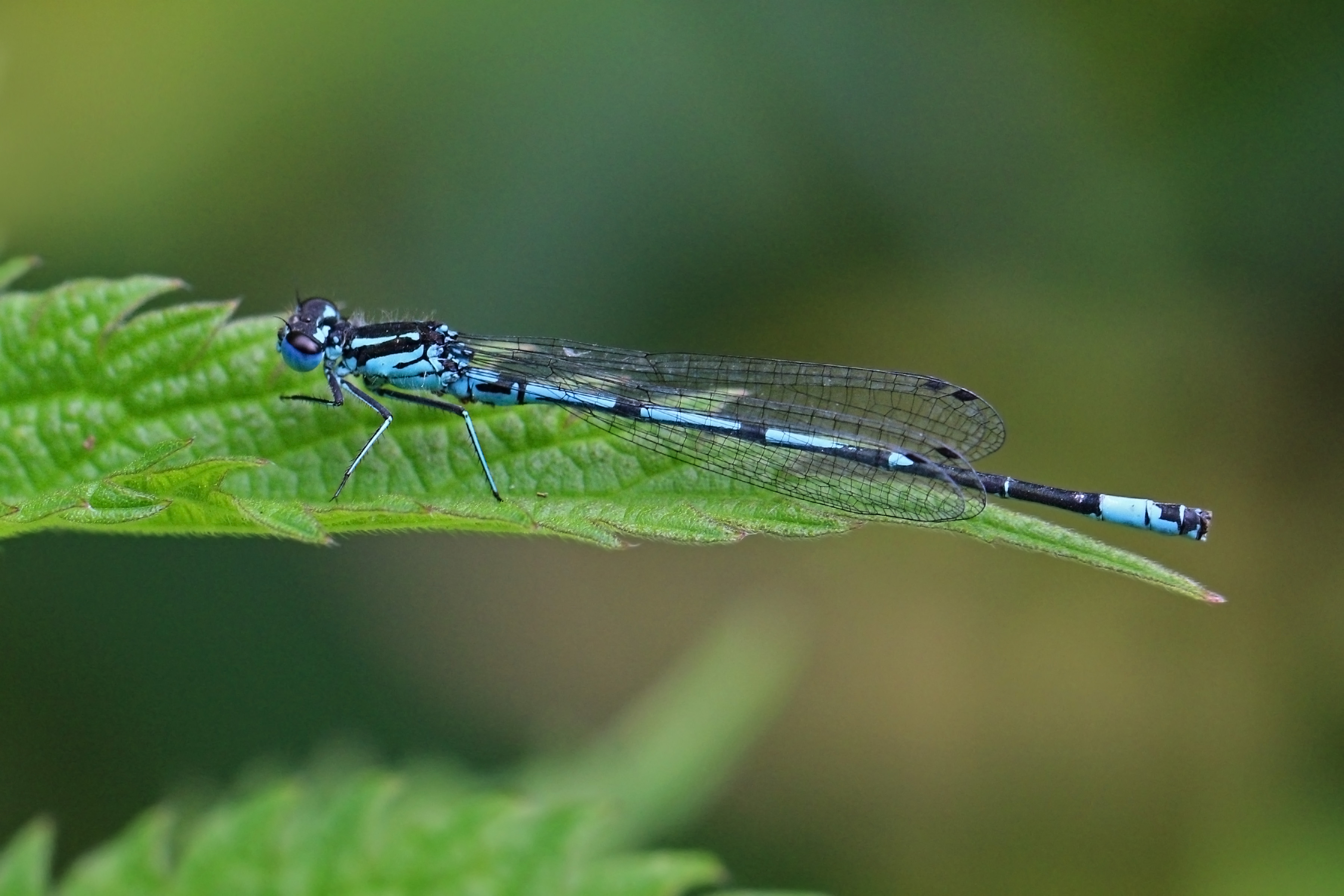
Variable damselfly (male; Coenagrion pulchellum)

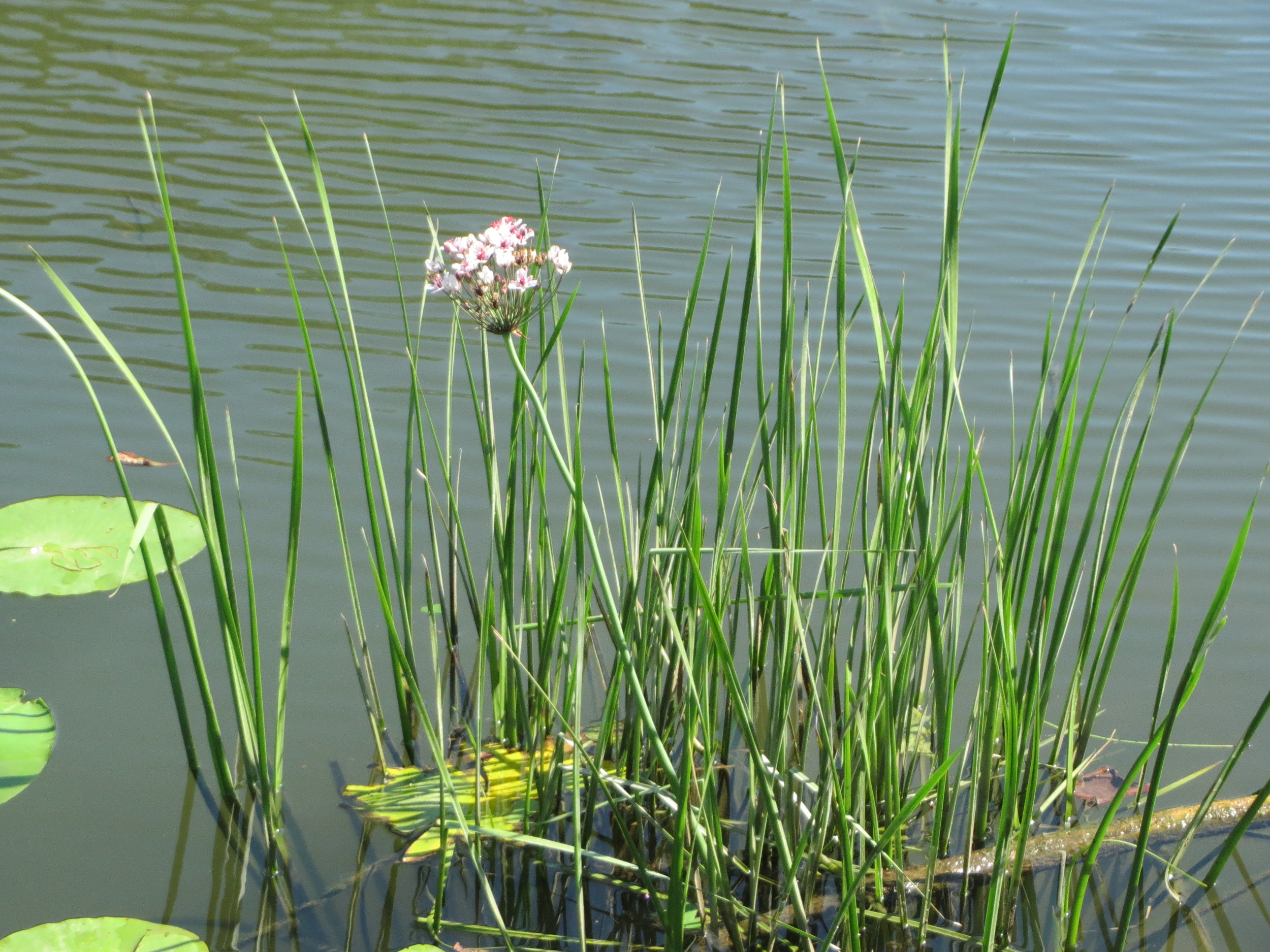
Flowering rush (Butomus umbellatus)

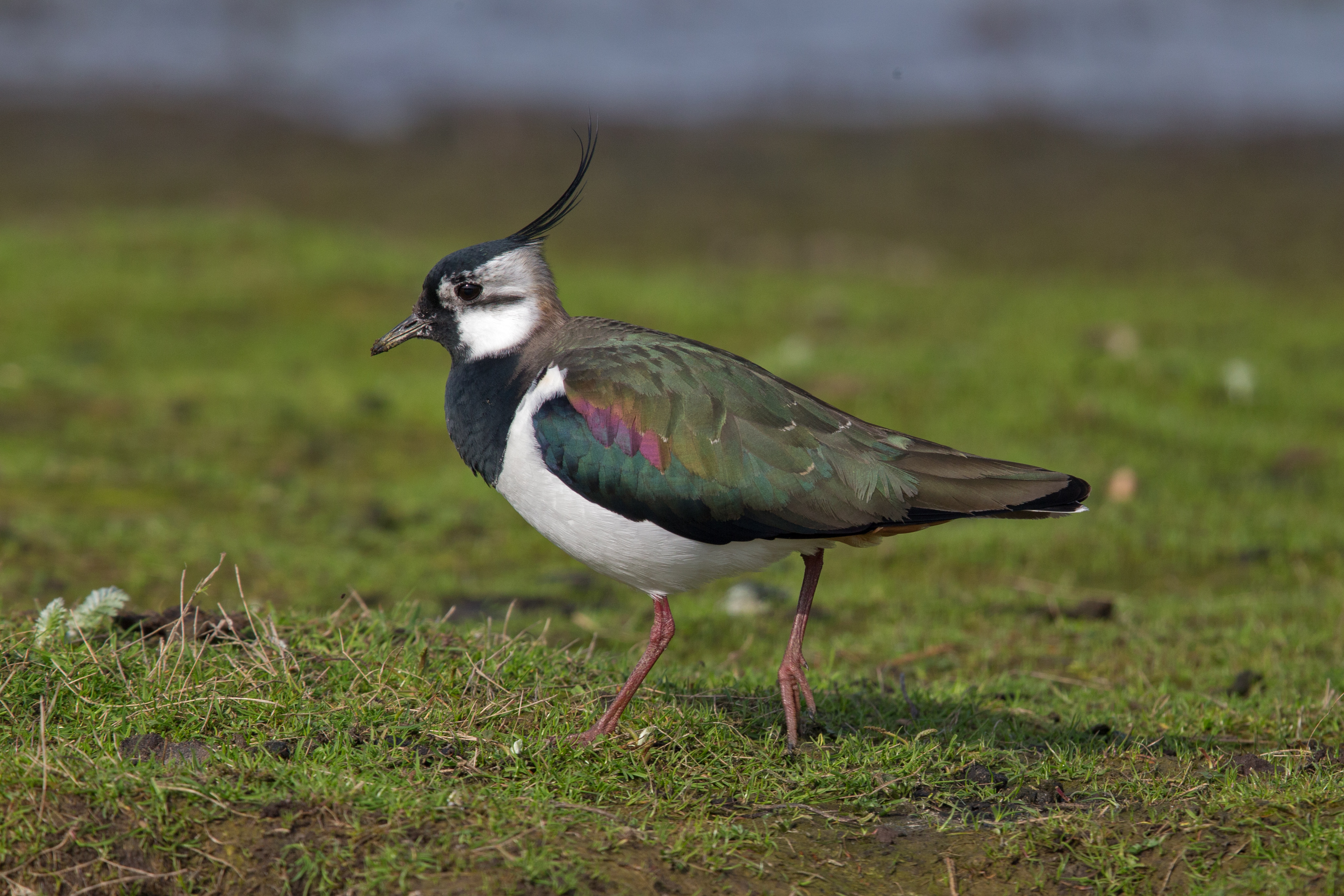
Northern lapwing (Vanellus vanellus)

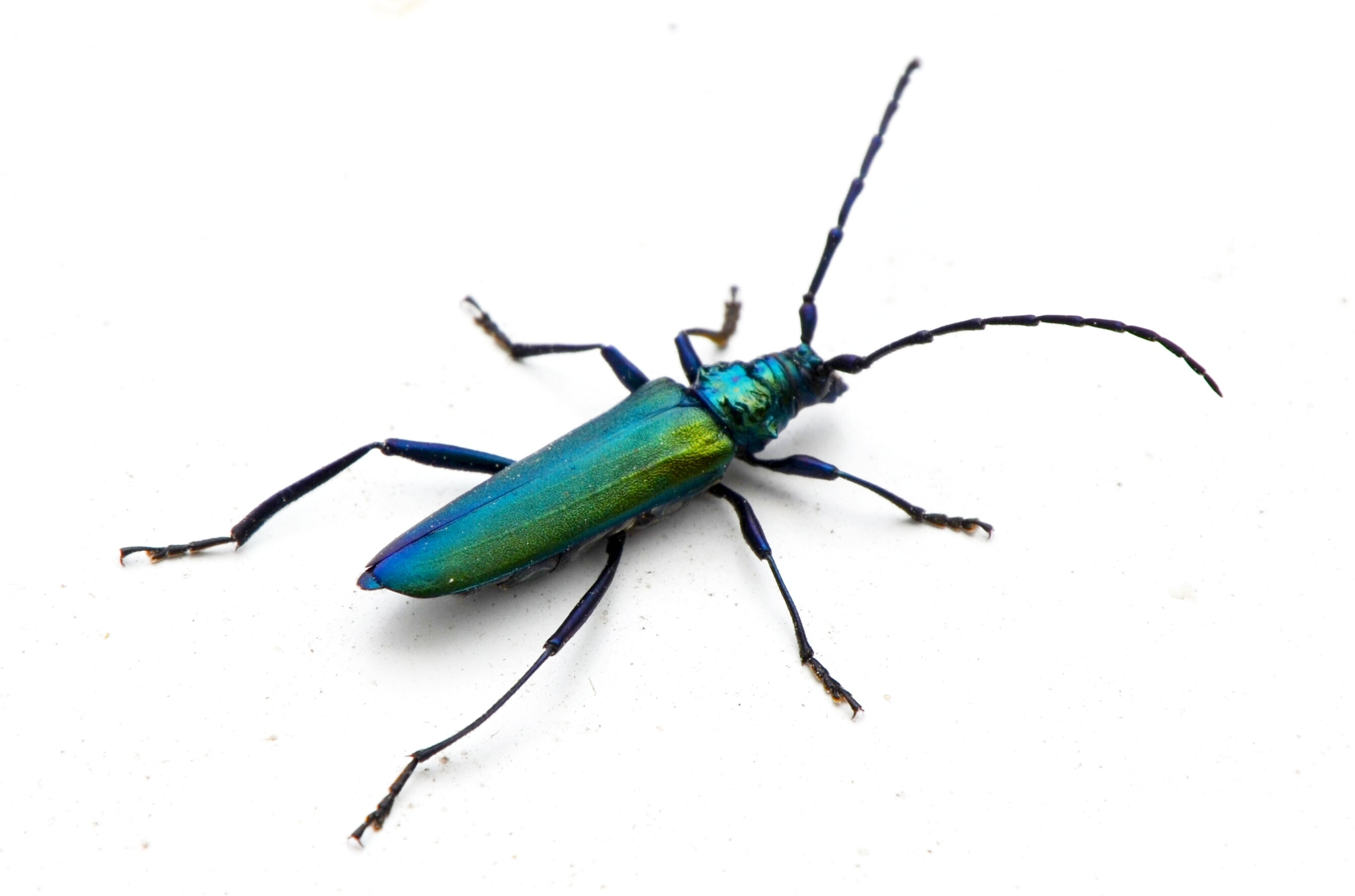
Musk beetle (Aromia moschata)

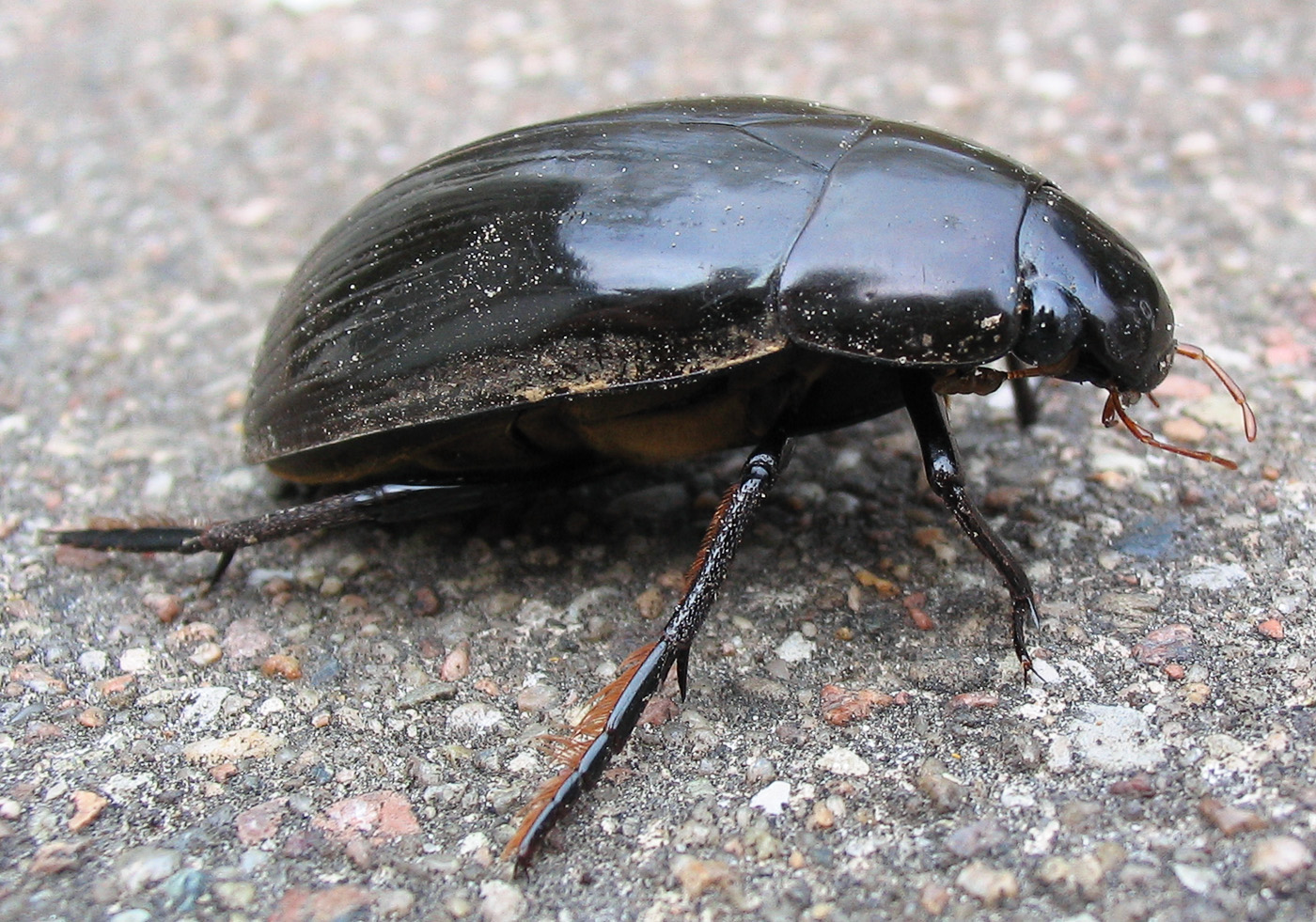
Great silver water beetle (Hydrophilus piceus)

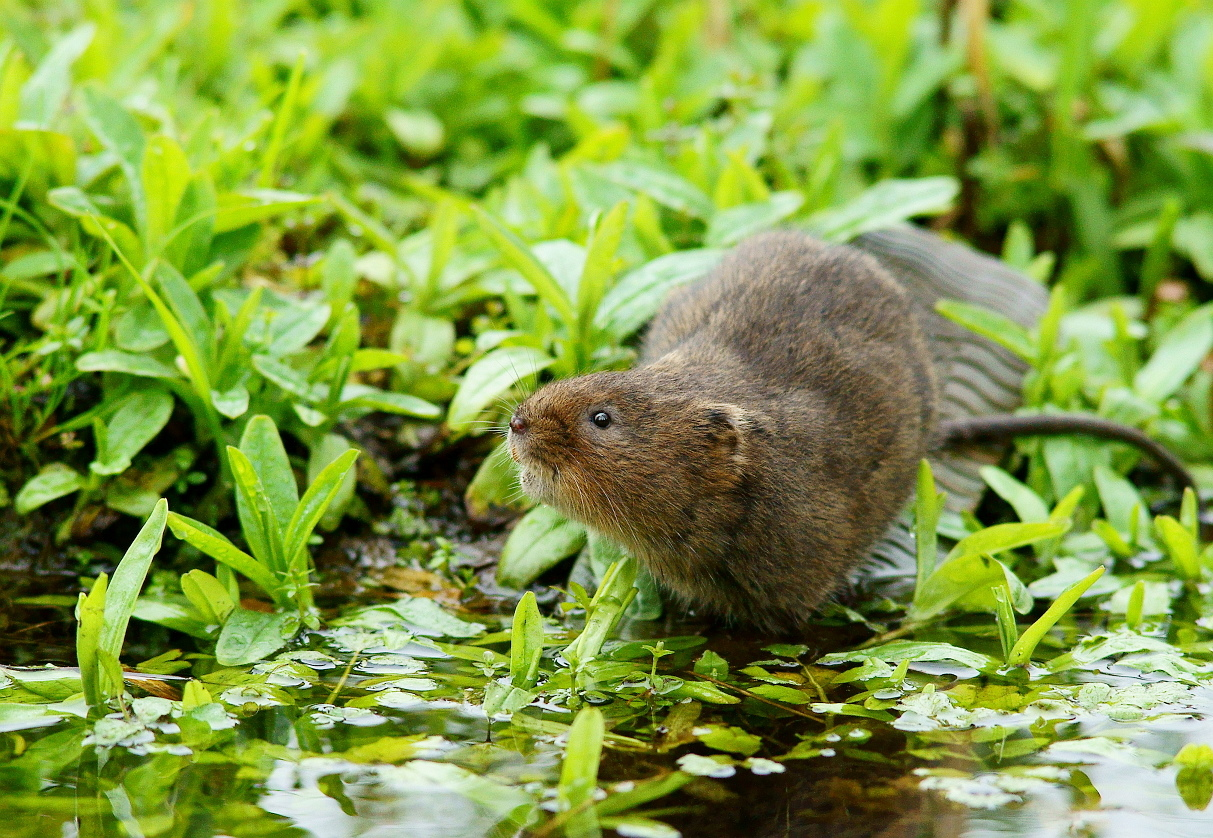
European water vole (Arvicola amphibius)
