= Uskmouth power stations =

Series of two coal-fired power stations south-east of Newport, Wales

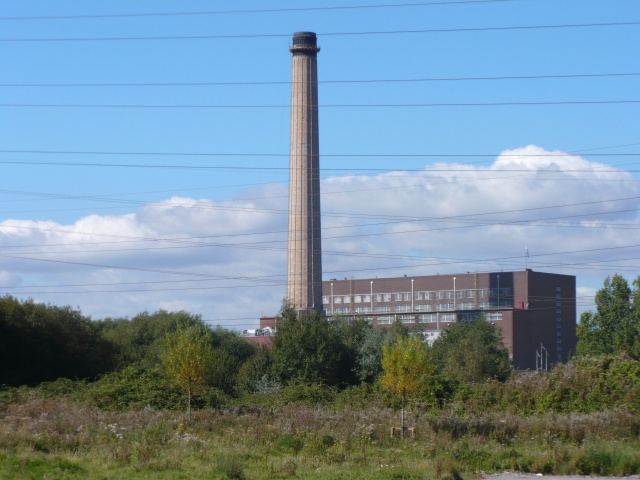
- Uskmouth B Power Station; Viewed from the south east, September 2007
- Country: Wales, United Kingdom
- Location: Newport
- Coordinates: 51.549071°N 2.970539°W
- Status: A station: Demolished; B station: Decommissioned
- Construction began: A station: 1948; B station: 1957
- Commission date: A station: 1952; B station: 1959
- Decommission date: A station: 1981; B station: by 2024
- Operators: British Electricity Authority (1952–1955) Central Electricity Authority (1955–1958); Central Electricity Generating Board (1958–1990); National Power (1990–1998); AES (1998–2003); Welsh Power (2004–2009); Scottish and Southern Energy (2009–2015); SIMEC Group (2015–present)

Thermal power station
- Primary fuel: Coal
- Tertiary fuel: Biomass
- Chimneys: A station: 2 B station: 1
- Cooling towers: None
- Cooling source: Sea water

Power generation
- Units operational: A station: 4 × 60 MW; B station: 3 × 110 MW
- Nameplate capacity: A station: 228 MW; B station: 363 MW

External links
- Website: www.sse.com/SSEInternet/index.aspx?rightColHeader=22&id=21202
- Commons: Related media on Commons

The Uskmouth power stations (also known as the Fifoots Point power stations) refers to a series of two coal-fired power stations at the mouth of the River Usk in the south-east of Newport, Wales.

The first of the two stations, Uskmouth A power station, was built in the 1940s and demolished in 2002. The second station, Uskmouth B power station, was built in the 1950s and as of 2023 has been decommissioned and mothballed.

== Uskmouth A ==
Uskmouth A power station was authorised in 1947, and building started in April 1948. The first generating set was commissioned in December 1952, followed by other sets in September 1953, March 1954, September 1954, June 1956 and finally December 1956 for a set scrapped in January 1956. It comprised four Fraser and Chalmers / GEC 60 MW hydrogen cooled 11.8 kV turbo-alternators, these were supplied with steam at 62.1 bars (6,210 kPa; 901 psi) and 482 °C (900 °F). The 12 Babcock and Wilcox pulverised fuel boilers were capable of delivering 320.0 kg/s (42,330 lb/min) of steam.

The generating capacity and output of the station was as follows.

Uskmouth A generating capacity and output
Year	Capacity MW	Electricity supplied GWh
1954	168	618.239
1955	228	1276.305
1956	228	1409.361
1957	342	1575.815
1958	342	2149.267
1961	360	1489.1
1962	360	1241.6
1963	360	1257.1
1967	360	1138.711
1971	360	887.514
1979	240	148.250
1981	228	19.802

On 18 January 1956, the No. 5 60-MW generator, a conventional steam turbine with a low pressure rotor driving a hydrogen cooled generator, suffered a catastrophic overspeed event. In the resulting explosion, two workers were killed and nine injured, and the turbine and generator were completely destroyed. Wreckage from the blast was propelled through the walls of the building and thrown as far as several hundred yards. Remarkably, the remaining four generator sets, which operating under full loads, experienced no interruption in operation.

The A station was closed on 26 October 1981 with a generating capacity of 228 megawatts. The station was demolished in 2002.

== Uskmouth B ==
Uskmouth B power station (or Uskmouth Power as it is now known) was authorised in May 1957 and built in 1959. It had a generating capacity of 363 MW, which is enough to power 360,000 homes, or the surrounding area of Newport. The electricity was provided by three English Electric 110 MW generating sets. Uskmouth B was one of the CEGB’s twenty steam power stations with the highest thermal efficiency at the time; in 1963–4 the thermal efficiency was 32.15 per cent, 32.72 per cent in 1964–5, and 32.89 per cent in 1965–6. The pulverised fuel boilers were capable of delivering 324.0 kg/s (42,860 lb/min) of steam at 103.4 bars (10,340 kPa; 1,500 psi) and 538 °C (1,000 °F). It was situated in an essential position for the National Grid, as there are very few power stations situated in the south of Wales. The annual electricity output of Uskmouth B was:

Electricity output of Uskmouth B
Year	1960–1	1961–2	1962–3	1963–4	1964–5	1965–6	1966–7	1971–2	1978–9	1980–1	1981–2
Electricity supplied, GWh	9.766	1006.7	1527.2	1,665	1,890	1,649	1,666	1,715	960.2	979.6	1,081

It was officially opened on Friday June 14 1963 by David Lewis, 1st Baron Brecon, it had cost £19.5m (£356 million in 2025).

Initially operated by the Central Electricity Generating Board, the station's operations were handed over to National Power with privatisation in 1990. The station was then closed in 1995. But in 1998, it was purchased by AES. The station was given a £120 million refurbishment to bring it up to date with legislative requirements. New environmental equipment was installed and it was given a refurbishment which is thought to have extended the station's life by 25 years. The station's generating capacity was also increased to 393 MW. In 2001 the work was completed and the station was reopened. However, only a year later the plant passed into receivership, but had a brief period of operating in the winter between 2003 and 2004. In June 2004 the station was put back into full operation, when it was bought by Welsh Power, who were then known as Carron Energy. Welsh Power sold it to SSE (Scottish and Southern Energy plc) in 2009 for £27m. In April 2013 one of the three remaining blocks was closed, leaving the power station with a remaining generation capacity of 260 MW.

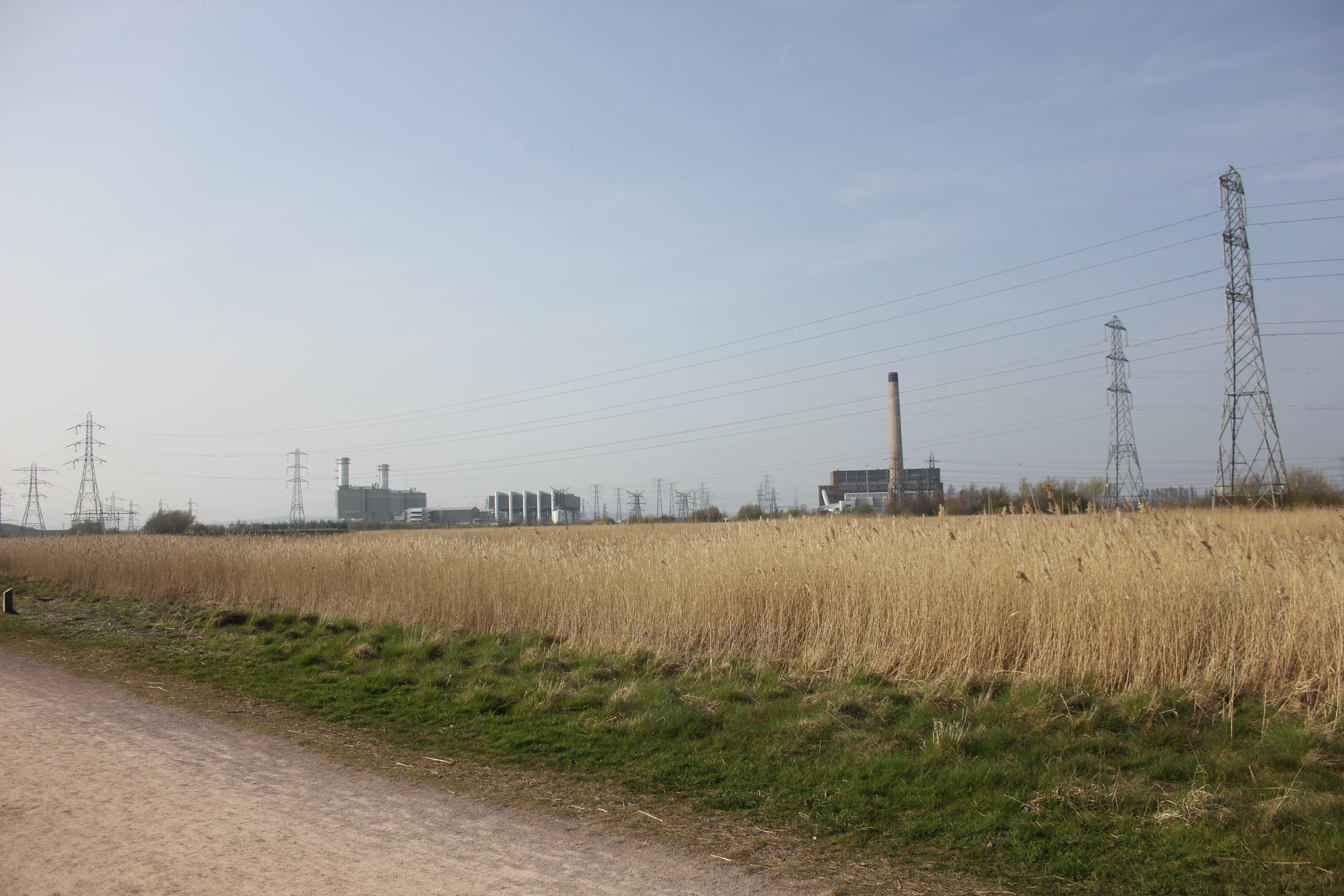
View of Severn (left) and Uskmouth (right) power stations from Newport Wetlands Reserve

The station was one of the cleanest coal-fired power stations in the United Kingdom, and was fitted with flue-gas desulphurisation equipment and low NO_{x} burners. It also burnt biomass, as well as coal, for its emissions to be considered closer to being carbon neutral. The station did not take water from or dump waste water into the River Usk. It instead used secondary treated sewage water in its cooling system.

The station employed 90 people. It was awarded RoSPA Gold Award for Occupational Health and Safety for its efforts to ensure station safety. The station's owners participated in many local community projects – they donated land to the Newport Wetlands Reserve, and sponsored Welsh swimmer David Davies and the Newport Gwent Dragons.

The station was earmarked for closure in 2014 and subsequently mothballed. However, in 2015, plans were announced to instead convert the station to run fully on pellets of biomass and waste plastic, as part of a scheme to regenerate the area and create hundreds of jobs. These plans then took priority and as a result, Uskmouth saw very infrequent use as a coal plant; with April 2017 being the last occasion.

In 2017, Simec Atlantis Energy joined a partnership to undertake this transformation by 2020. In 2019, it was reported that the plant would be running on 50% pellets of plastic and 50% pellets of cardboard and paper by 2021 and was expected to operate for 20 years. However, in April 2022, Simec Atlantis Energy announced it was abandoning the waste-to-energy conversion project, following opposition from environmental groups and the call in of the conversion application by the Welsh Government.

In December 2023, the site's operator Simec Uskmouth Power Ltd obtained planning consent to demolish the station's two banks of cooling towers, with the demolition expected to be completed by May 2024.

In January 2024, Simec was granted planning permission to construct a battery energy storage system on the site of the to-be-demolished cooling towers. Media reporting of this development also confirmed that Uskmouth B power station was decommissioned as of that date. In 2025, size was estimated at 250 MW for 5 hours.

== Severn Power Station ==
An 832 MW combined cycle power plant running on natural gas, known as Severn Power Station, was built on the site of Uskmouth A by Siemens. It comprises two gas turbines and two steam turbines, each operating on a single shaft, and entered commercial operations in November 2010. It was initially reported that it would cost £400 million to build and create 650 construction jobs.

Originally owned and operated by the Danish company DONG Energy (now Ørsted), the station was acquired in December 2013 by MPF Holdings, which later changed its name to Calon Energy. The station was put into a 'dormant state' in August 2020 following Calon Energy entering administration.

Centrica completed acquisition of the 850MW Severn power station on 7 May 2026.

== Uses in culture ==
=== In Television ===
- In 2006, the station was used as a location for two episodes of Doctor Who. In the episodes "Rise of the Cybermen" and "The Age of Steel", the station was used as the setting for the Cybermen Factory. It was then used again for the 2011 Christmas special "The Doctor, the Widow and the Wardrobe" as spaceship corridors, filmed on 20 September 2011. In 2014, the station was once again used for two episodes "Into the Dalek" and "Time Heist".
- The exterior of the station was used for the Setting of the Turnmill Nuclear Power Station in the Doctor Who Spin-off Torchwood. It was used in the final episode of the second season, Exit Wounds, in which Owen Harper met his second and final death.
