= Newport, Wales =

City and county borough in Wales

Newport Casnewydd (Welsh)
- County borough and city
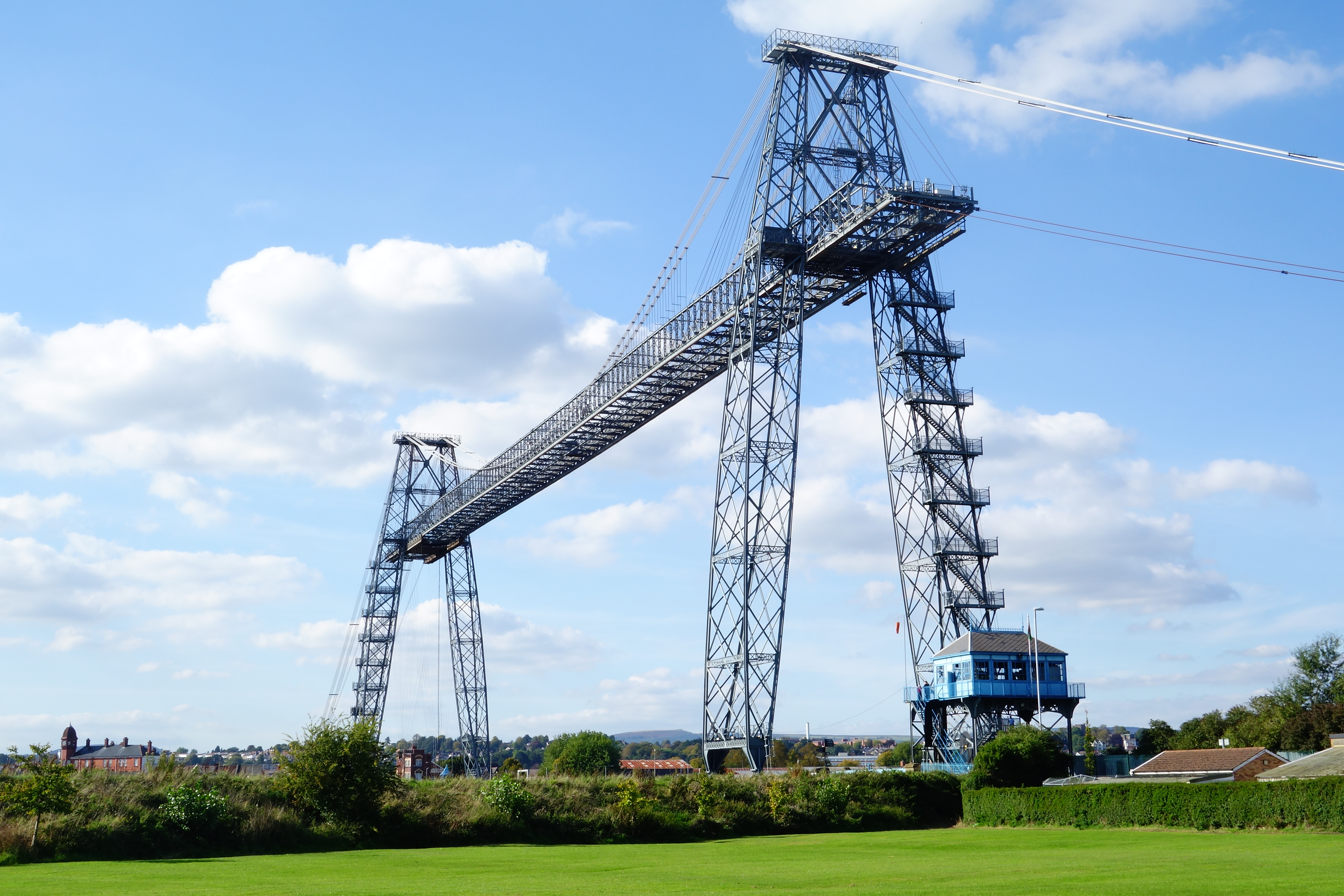
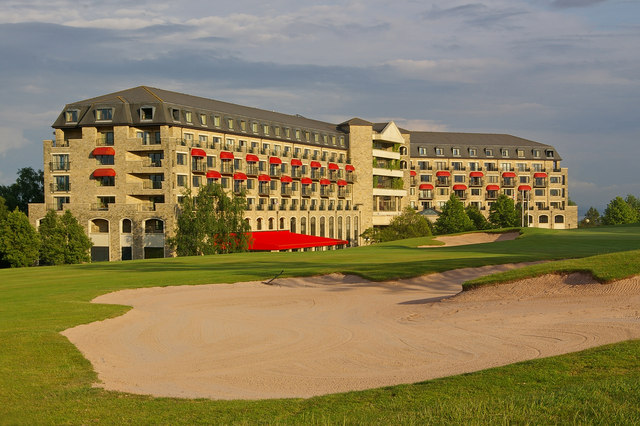
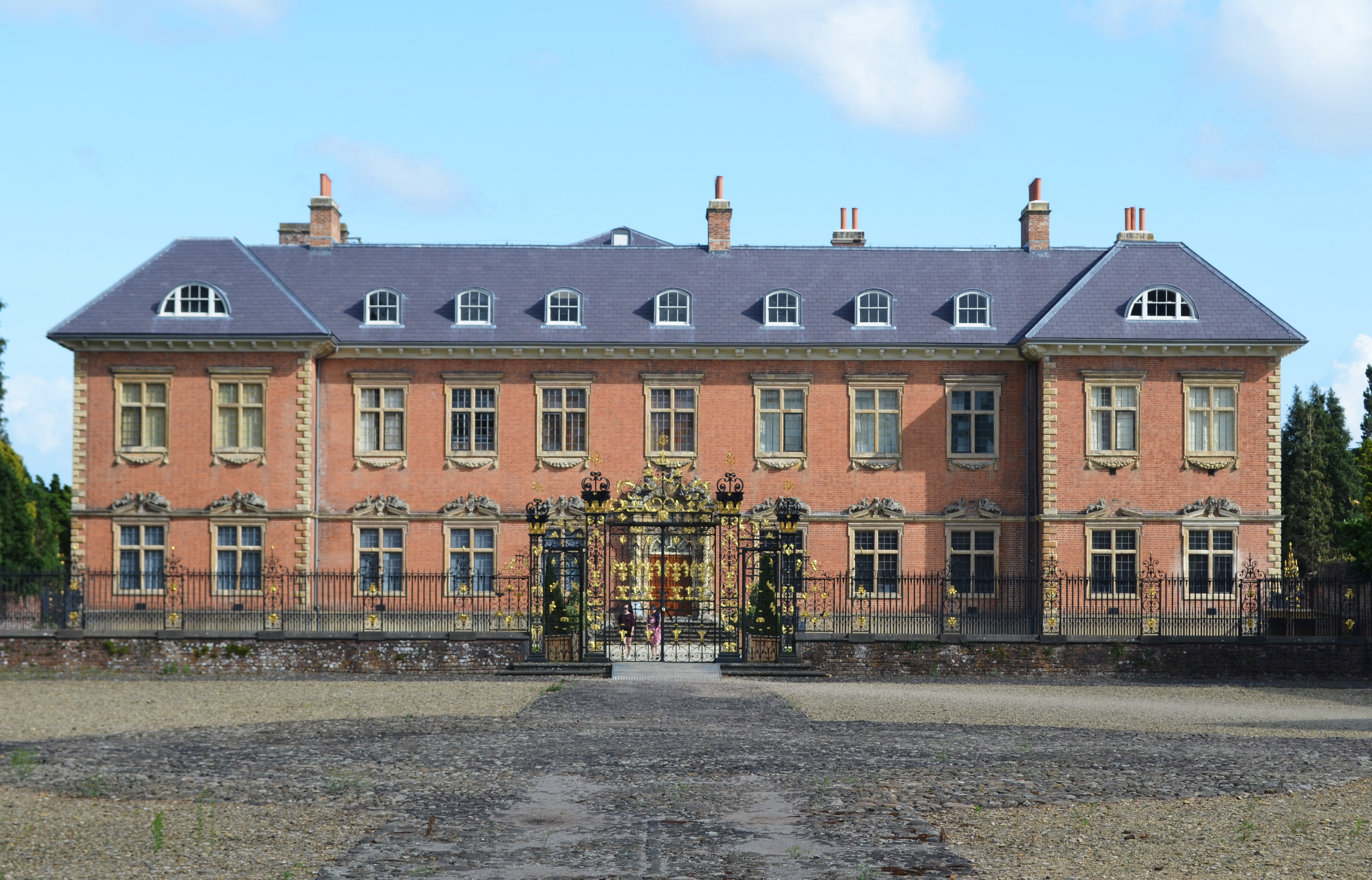
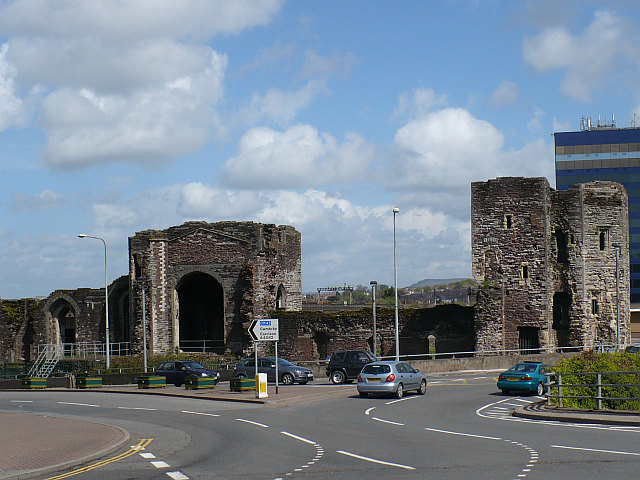
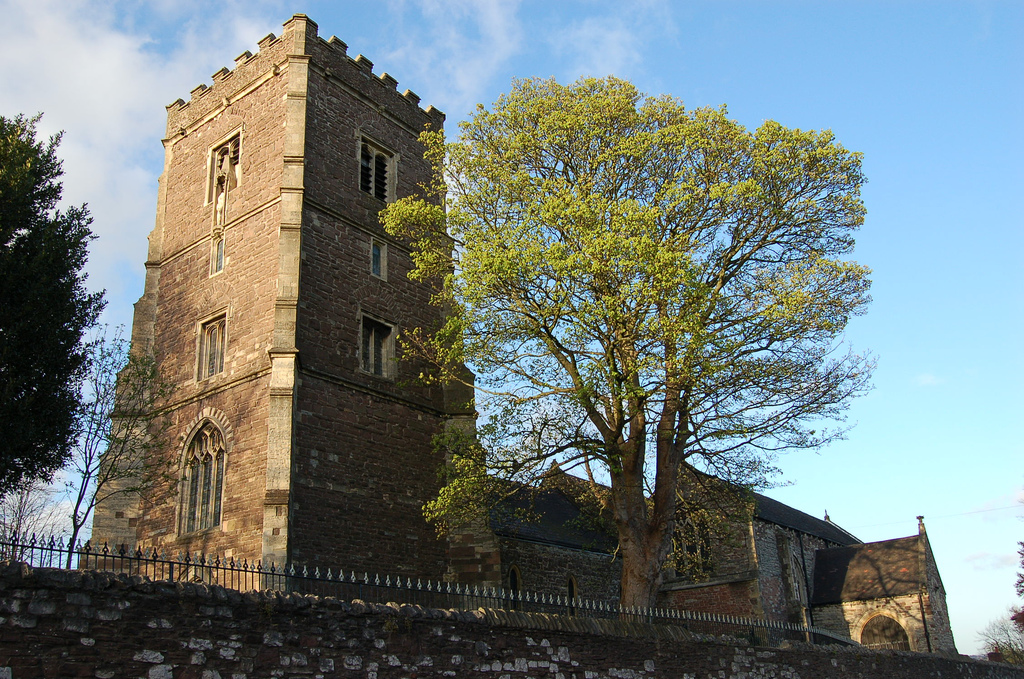
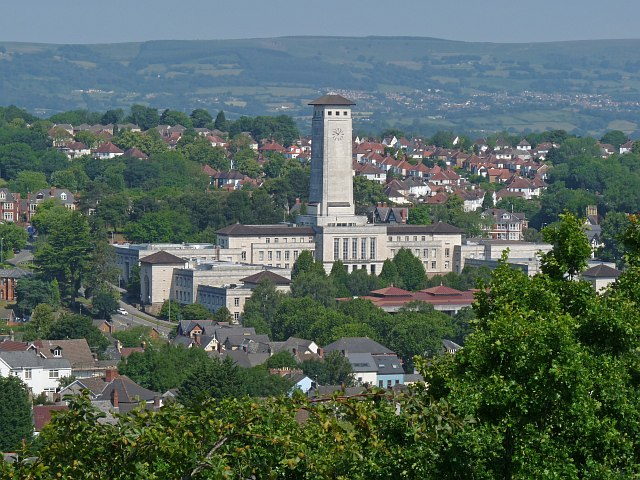
- Clockwise from top: Newport Transporter Bridge, Tredegar House, Newport Cathedral, Newport Civic Centre, Newport Castle, and Celtic Manor Resort

- Coat of arms
- Motto: Latin: Terra Marique, lit. 'by land and sea'
- Newport shown within Wales
- Coordinates: 51°35′19″N 02°59′52″W
- Sovereign state: United Kingdom
- Country: Wales
- Preserved county: Gwent
- Borough status: c. 1120
- Town charter: 1385
- City status: 2002
- Administrative HQ: Newport Civic Centre

Government
  - Type: Principal council
  - Body: Newport City Council
  - Control: Labour
  - MPs: 2 MPs: Jessica Morden (L); Ruth Jones (L)
  - MSs: 6 in Casnewydd Islwyn

Area
  - Total: 73 sq mi (190 km^{2})
  - Rank: 18th

Population (2025)
  - Total: 168,584
  - Rank: 6th
  - Density: 2,290/sq mi (885/km^{2})
- Demonym: Newportonians
- Time zone: UTC+0 (GMT)
  - Summer (DST): UTC+1 (BST)
- Postcode areas: NP
- Dialling codes: 01633
- ISO 3166 code: GB-NWP
- GSS code: W06000022
- Website: newport.gov.uk

Newport (Welsh: Casnewydd [kasˈnɛwɨð]) is a city and county borough in Wales, on the River Usk near its confluence with the Severn Estuary, approximately 12 mi (19 km) northeast of Cardiff. The population grew significantly between the 2011 and the 2021 census, increasing from 145,700 to 159,587, the largest growth of any unitary authority in Wales. Newport is the third-largest principal authority with city status in Wales and the sixth most populous overall. Newport became a unitary authority in 1996 and forms part of the Cardiff–Newport metropolitan area, and the Cardiff Capital Region.

Newport has been a port since the Middle Ages, originating with the construction of Newport Castle by the Normans. The town eventually outgrew the earlier Roman settlement of Caerleon, located just upstream and now incorporated into the city. Newport received its first charter in 1314. The town experienced significant growth during the 19th century, as its port became a major hub for coal exports from the eastern South Wales Valleys. For a time, Newport was the largest coal-exporting port in Wales, until Cardiff surpassed it in the mid-1800s. Newport was also the site of the last large-scale armed insurrection in Great Britain, the Newport Rising of 1839.

In the 20th century, Newport's docks declined in significance, but the town remained a vital hub for manufacturing and engineering. More recently, its economy has benefitted from its location within the high-technology M4 corridor, with expanding aerospace and semiconductor industries. Newport was granted city status in 2002. The Celtic Manor Resort, located in the city, hosted the Ryder Cup in 2010 and the NATO summit in 2014. While the urban core is well developed, Newport also includes rural areas, with several villages of notable archaeological interest. Newport Cathedral, the seat of the Anglican Bishop of Monmouth, serves as the cathedral for the Diocese of Monmouth.

== Toponymy ==
The original Welsh name for the city was Casnewydd-ar-Wysg (pronounced [kasˈnɛwɪð ar ˈwɪsk]). This is a contraction of the name Castell Newydd ar Wysg, which translates as 'new castle on the Usk'. The Welsh name is recorded in the Brut y Tywysogion when it was visited by Henry II of England sometime around 1172. "New castle" suggests a pre-existing fortification in the vicinity and is most likely either to reference the ancient fort on Stow Hill, or a fort that occupied the site of the present castle.

The English name 'Newport' is a later application. The settlement was first recorded by the Normans as novo burgus in 1126. This Latin name refers to the new borough (or town) established with the Norman castle. The origin of the name Newport and the reason for its wide adoption remains the subject of debate. Newport-on-Usk is found on some early maps, and the name was in popular usage well before the development of Newport Docks. One theory suggests that Newport gained favour with medieval maritime traders on the Usk, as it differentiated the "New port" from the "Old Roman port" at Caerleon.

== History ==
=== Early history ===
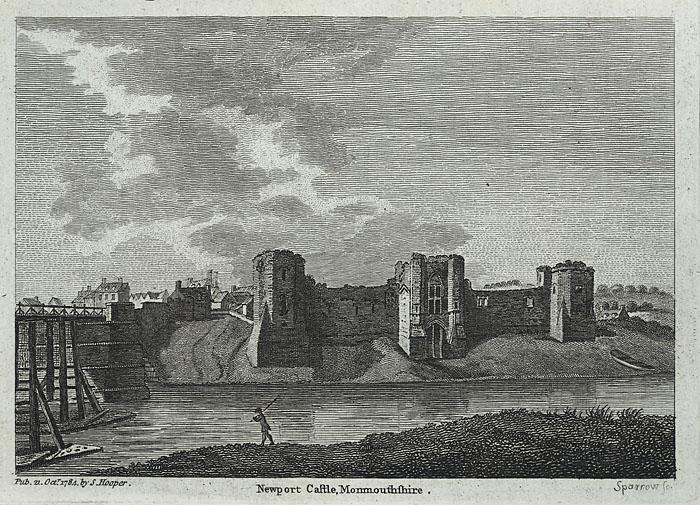
Newport Castle in 1784

Bronze Age fishermen settled around the fertile estuary of the River Usk and later the Celtic Silures built hillforts overlooking it. In AD 75, on the very edge of their empire, the Roman legions built a Roman fort at Caerleon to defend the river crossing. According to legend, in the late 5th century Saint Gwynllyw (Woolos), the patron saint of Newport and King of Gwynllwg founded the church which would become Newport Cathedral. The church was certainly in existence by the 9th century and today has become the seat of the Bishop of Monmouth. In 1049/50, a fleet of Orkney Vikings, under Welsh king Gruffydd ap Llywelyn, sailed up the Usk and sacked St Gwynllyw's church. The church suffered a similar fate in 1063, when Harold Godwinson attacked south Wales. The Normans arrived from around 1088–1093 to build the first Newport Castle and river crossing downstream from Caerleon and the first Norman Lord of Newport was Robert Fitzhamon.

The original Newport Castle was a small motte-and-bailey castle in the park opposite Newport Cathedral. It was buried in rubble excavated from the Hillfield railway tunnels that were dug under Stow Hill in the 1840s and no part of it is currently visible.

=== Norman invasion and early modern Newport ===
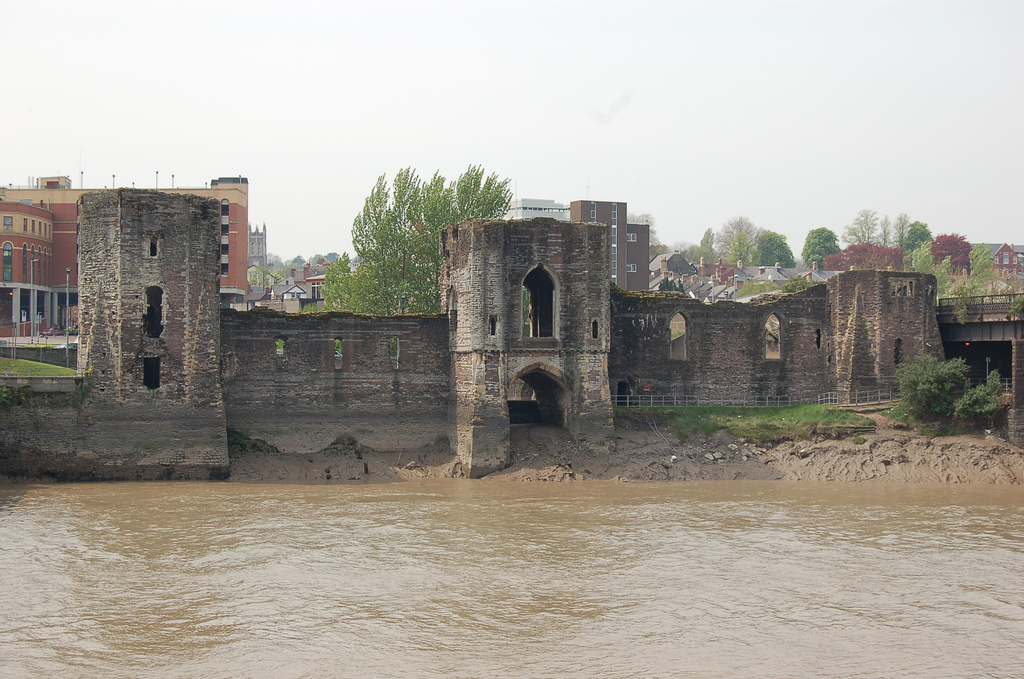
Newport Castle, on the west bank of the River Usk

Around the settlement, the new town grew to become Newport. Newport obtained its first charter in 1314. It was granted a second one by Hugh Stafford, 2nd Earl of Stafford in 1385. The Newport coat of arms reflects those of the Staffords: theirs was a red chevron - pointing upwards- on a gold field, Newport's is a red chevron reversed - pointing downward - on the same background. In the 14th century Augustinian friars came to Newport where they built an isolation hospital for infectious diseases. After its closure the hospital lived on in the place name "Spytty Fields" (a corruption of ysbyty, the Welsh for hospital). "Austin Friars" also remains a street name in the city.

During the Last War for Welsh Independence in 1402 Rhys Gethin, General for Owain Glyndŵr, forcibly took Newport Castle together with those at Cardiff, Llandaff, Abergavenny, Caerphilly, Caerleon and Usk. During the raid the town of Newport was badly burned and Saint Woolos church destroyed.

A third charter, establishing the right of the town to run its own market and commerce came from Humphrey Stafford, 1st Duke of Buckingham in 1426. By 1521, Newport was described as having "....a good haven coming into it, well occupied with small crays [merchant ships] where a very great ship may resort and have good harbour." Trade was thriving with the nearby ports of Bristol and Bridgwater and industries included leather tanning, soap making and starch making. The town's craftsmen included bakers, butchers, brewers, carpenters and blacksmiths. A further charter was granted by James I in 1623.

During the English Civil War in 1648 Oliver Cromwell's troops camped overnight on Christchurch Hill overlooking the town before their attack on the castle the next day. A cannonball dug up from a garden in nearby Summerhill Avenue, dating from this time, now rests in Newport Museum.

=== Industrial Revolution ===
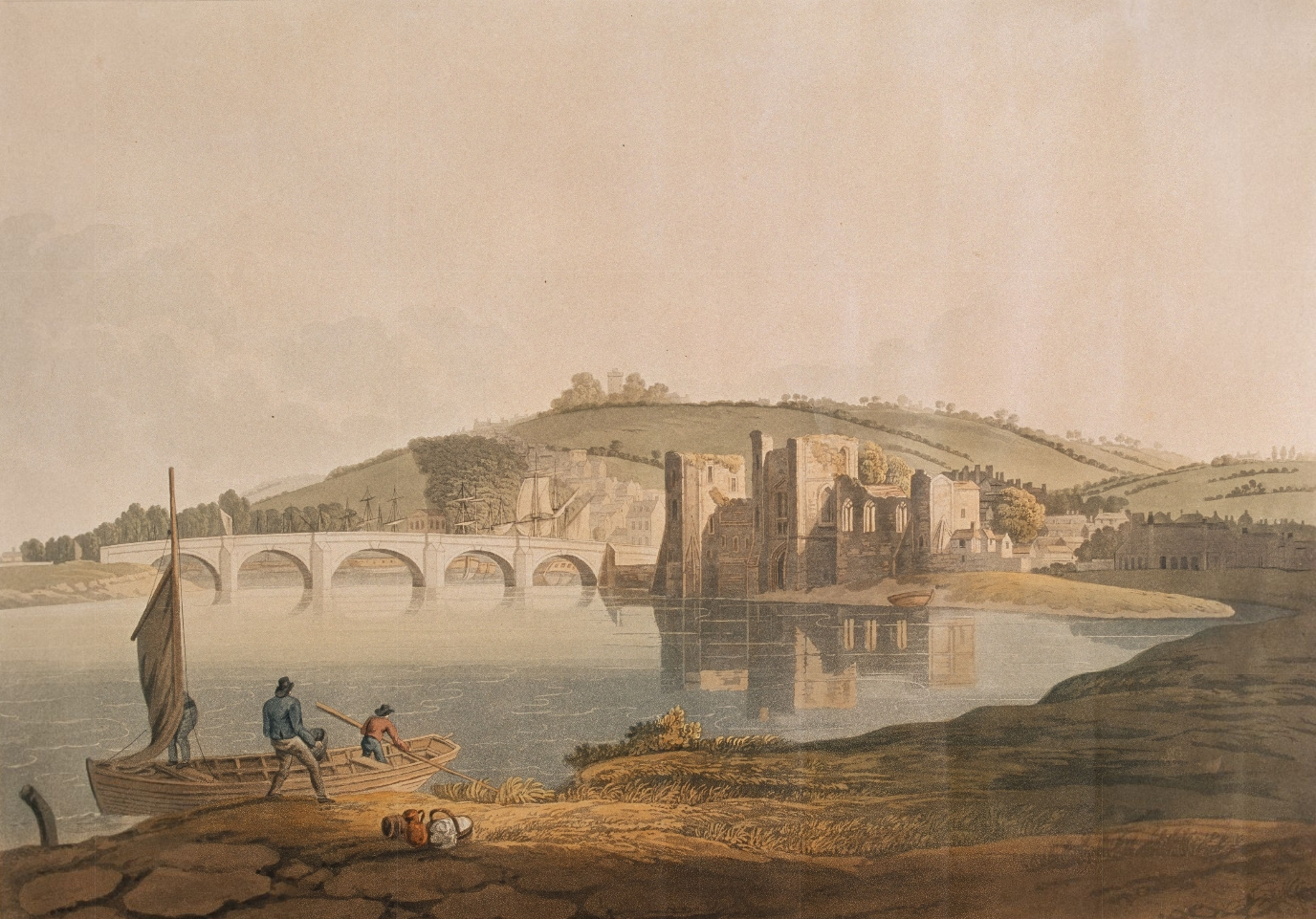
Newport, 1813

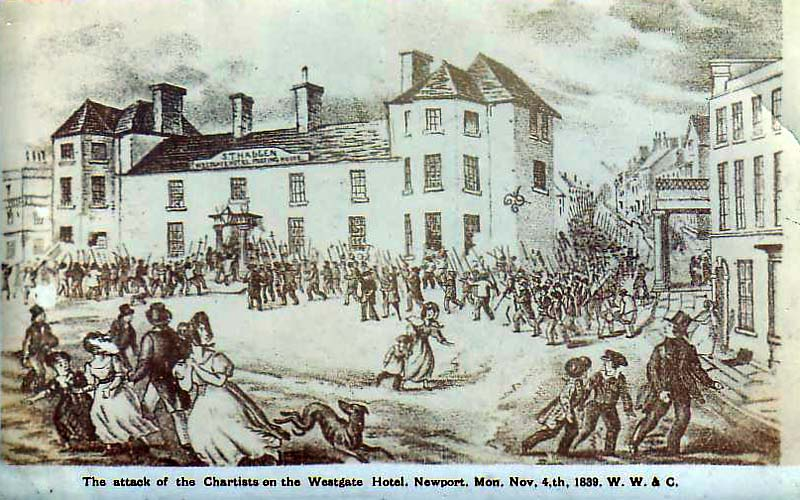
The attack on the Chartists by the Westgate Hotel, 4 November 1839

As the Industrial Revolution transformed Britain in the 19th century, the South Wales Valleys became key suppliers of coal from the South Wales Coalfield, and iron. These were transported down local rivers and the new canals to ports such as Newport, and Newport Docks grew rapidly as a result. Newport became one of the largest towns in Wales and the focus for the new industrial eastern valleys of South Wales. By 1830 Newport was Wales' leading coal port, and until the 1850s it was larger than Cardiff.

The Newport Rising in 1839 was the last large-scale armed rebellion against authority in mainland Britain. John Frost and 3,000 other Chartists marched on the Westgate Hotel at the centre of the town, where chartists were being held prisoner, with some of the chartists being armed. Shooting began between the chartists and the 45th Regiment of Foot, which had been called to the town by the Mayor of Newport, Thomas Phillips, to assist the police. At least 20 chartists were killed and were later buried in Saint Woolos churchyard. Thomas Philips and three of those in the hotel were wounded. John Frost was sentenced to death for treason, but this was later commuted to transportation to Australia. He returned to Britain (but not to Newport) later in his life. John Frost Square (1977), in the centre of the city, is named in his honour.

Newport probably had a Welsh-speaking majority until the 1830s, but with a large influx of migrants from England and Ireland over the following decades, the town and the rest of Monmouthshire came to be seen as "un-Welsh", a view compounded by ambiguity about the status of Monmouthshire. In the 19th century, the St George Society of Newport (a group largely consisting of English settlers and businessmen) asserted that the town was part of England. It was at a meeting in Newport, attended by future Prime Minister David Lloyd George, that the Cymru Fydd movement received its death-blow in 1896 when politician Robert Bird stated: "You will find, from Swansea to Newport, a cosmopolitan population who will not submit to the domination of Welsh ideas!". Lloyd George was to suffer a further blow in Newport, when the South Wales Liberal Federation, led by David Alfred Thomas, an industrialist and Liberal politician, and Robert Bird moved that Lloyd George "be not heard" in the 1895 General Election. The Conservative capture of the recently created Newport constituency in a by-election in 1922 was one of the causes of the fall of his coalition government.

The late 19th and early 20th century period was a boom time for Newport. The Alexandra Docks opened in 1875. The population was expanding rapidly and the town became a county borough in 1891. In 1892 the Alexandra South Dock was opened and was the largest masonry dock in the world. Although coal exports from Newport were by now modest compared to the Port of Cardiff (which included Cardiff, Penarth and Barry), Newport was the place where the Miners' Federation of Great Britain was founded in 1889, and international trade was sufficiently large for 8 consuls and 14 vice-consuls to be based in the town. In 1898 Lysaght's Orb Works opened and by 1901 employed 3,000 staff. Urban expansion took in Pillgwenlly and Lliswerry to the south; this eventually necessitated a new crossing of the River Usk, which was provided by the Newport Transporter Bridge completed in 1906, described as "Newport's greatest treasure".

Further extensions to the South Dock were opened in 1907 and 1914. The Newport Docks Disaster occurred on 2 July 1909 when, during the construction of the new south lock connecting the South Dock to the Severn Estuary, supporting timbers in an excavation trench collapsed and buried 46 workers. Rescuers included a 12-year-old paperboy, Thomas 'Toya' Lewis, who was small enough to crawl into the collapsed trench. He worked for two hours trying to free one of the trapped men, who was finally released the next day. A public subscription raised several hundred pounds and Lewis was sent on an engineering scholarship. He was also awarded the Albert Medal for Lifesaving by King Edward VII. Memorials to the dead are in St Mark's Church, close to the centre of the city. A pub in the city centre was named "The Tom Toya Lewis" in his honour, but closed in 2021. The building in which the pub was housed was formerly the Newport YMCA, the foundation stone for which was laid by Viscount Tredegar in 1909.

From 1893 the town was served by the paddle steamers of P & A Campbell Ltd. (the "White Funnel Line"), which was based in Bristol. The company had originally been set up by the Scottish brothers Alex and Peter Campbell on the River Clyde, but was re-located to the Severn Estuary. Departing steamers would face south on Davis Wharf, with the Art College to its left and the town bridge behind. The boats gave rise to the name of the short street which led to the quayside – Screwpacket Road. By 1955 steamers had stopped calling at Newport and P & A Campbell went into receivership in 1959. It was taken over by the firm which would become the Townsend Ferry group.

Compared to many Welsh towns, Newport's economy had a broad base, with foundries, engineering works, a cattle market and shops that served much of Monmouthshire. However, the docks were in decline even before the Great Depression, and local unemployment peaked at 34.7% in 1930: high, but not as bad as the levels seen in the mining towns of the South Wales Valleys. Despite the economic conditions, the council re-housed over half the population in the 1920s and 1930s. In 1930 the Town Dock was filled in.

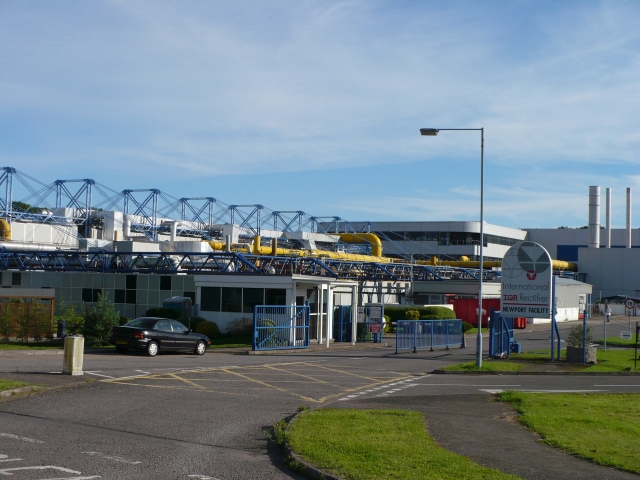
The former Inmos microprocessor factory, now owned by Vishay

The post-war years saw renewed prosperity, with Saint Woolos' Cathedral (now Newport Cathedral) attaining full cathedral status in 1949, the opening of the modern integrated Llanwern steelworks in 1962, and the construction of the Severn Bridge and local sections of the M4 motorway in the late 1960s, making Newport the best-connected place in Wales. Although employment at Llanwern steelworks declined in the 1980s, the town acquired a range of new public sector employers, and a Richard Rogers–designed Inmos microprocessor factory helped to establish Newport as a centre for technology companies.

A flourishing local music scene in the early 1990s led to claims that the town was "a new Seattle".

The county borough of Newport was granted city status in 2002 to mark Queen Elizabeth II's Golden Jubilee. In the same year, an unusually large merchant ship, referred to locally as the Newport Ship, was uncovered and rescued from the west bank of the River Usk during the construction of the Riverfront Arts Centre. The ship has been dated to between 1445 and 1469 and remains the only vessel of its type from this period yet discovered anywhere in the world.

=== Key dates in Newport's history ===
- c. 1075: Norman wood motte and bailey castle built on Stow Hill.
- 1314: First town charter.
- 1327–1386: Newport Castle built.
- 1385: Second town charter granted by Hugh Stafford, 2nd Earl of Stafford.
- 1402: Town was taken by the forces of Owain Glyndŵr, rebel Prince of Wales during the Welsh Revolt: Saint Woolos Church destroyed.
- 1426: Third town charter granted by Humphrey Stafford, 1st Duke of Buckingham.
- 1648: Town was taken by the forces of Oliver Cromwell during the English Civil War.
- 1672: Tredegar House completed.
- 1796: Opening of the Monmouthshire Canal.
- 1839: Chartist Newport Rising, Westgate Hotel, Newport led by radical former mayor John Frost.
- 1842: Newport Town Dock opens – floating dock able to accommodate the largest ships in the world.
- 1858: Town Dock extended to the north.
- 1867: Lower Dock Street drill hall completed.
- 1871: W. H. Davies, renowned poet born at Portland Street, Pillgwenlly.
- 1875: Alexandra Dock opens.
- 1877: Athletic grounds at Rodney Parade opens.
- 1887: The Boys' Brigade movement in Wales founded by George Philip Reynolds at Havelock Street Presbyterian Church.
- 1891: Newport gains County Borough status, governed independently of Monmouthshire.
- 1892: Alexandra South Dock opens, extended 1907 (phase2) and 1914 (phase3).
- 1880–1900: Godfrey Morgan, 1st Viscount Tredegar donates land for the benefit of the public, including Belle Vue Park, the Royal Gwent Hospital and Newport Athletic Grounds.
- 1894: Belle Vue Park opens.
- 1898: Lysaght's Orb Works steelworks opens.

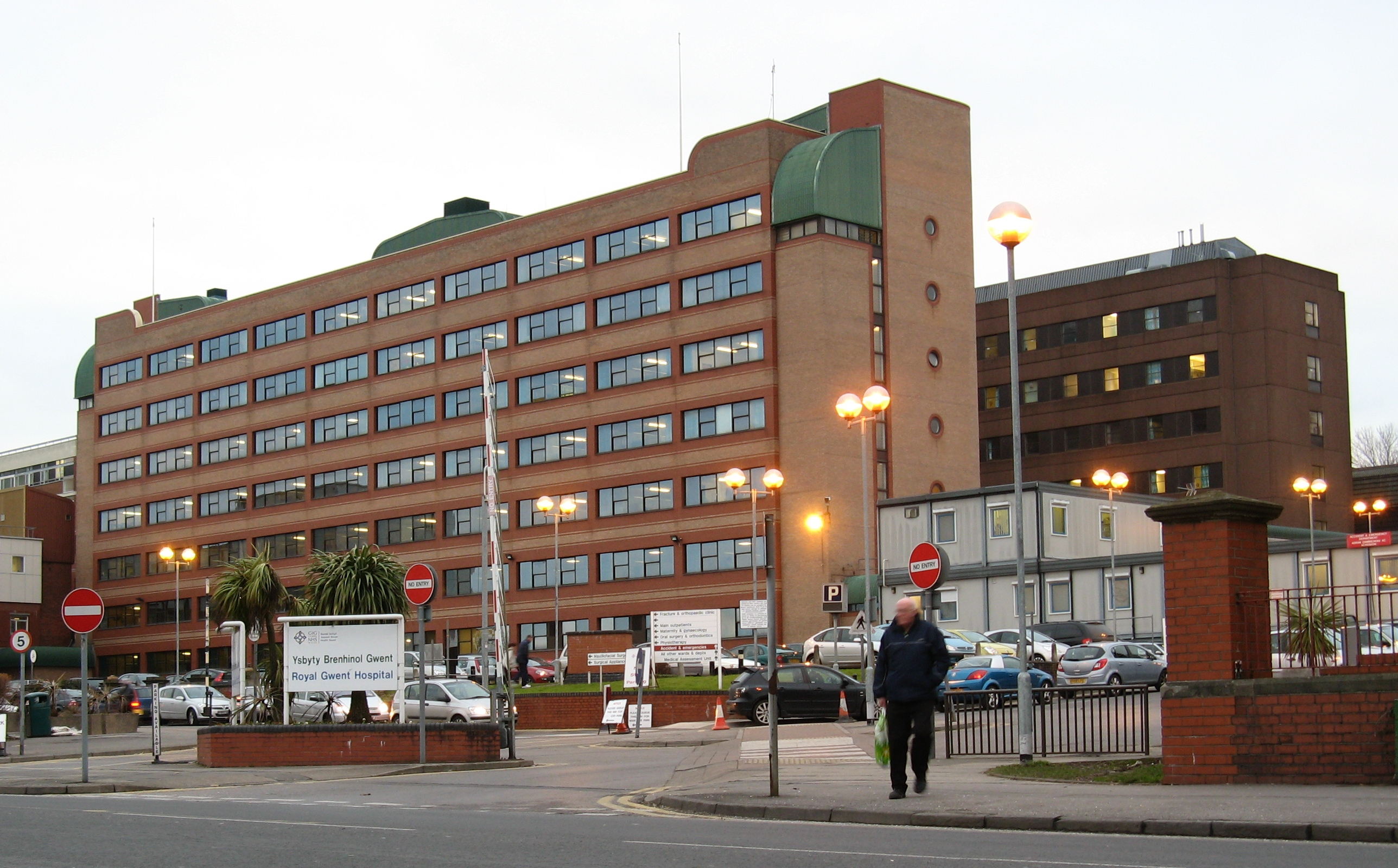
Royal Gwent Hospital, Cardiff Road

- 1901: Royal Gwent Hospital (originally the Newport and Monmouthshire Infirmary) opens on its current site
- 1906: Newport Transporter Bridge opens on 12 September.
- 1909: Newport Docks Disaster.
- 1915: First public automatic telephone exchange made in Britain opens in Newport.
- 1919: George Street/Ruperra Street Race Riots.
- 1921: Diocese of Monmouth created, following the disestablishment of the Church in Wales: the new Bishop of Monmouth expects to be based at St Woolos Church for a short time until a planned new cathedral is built.
- 1930: Town Dock closes and filled in.
- 1937: King George VI visits Newport and cuts first sod of new Civic Centre building.
- 1949: Saint Woolos pro-Cathedral attains full cathedral status, (now Newport Cathedral).
- 1962: Llanwern steelworks opens.

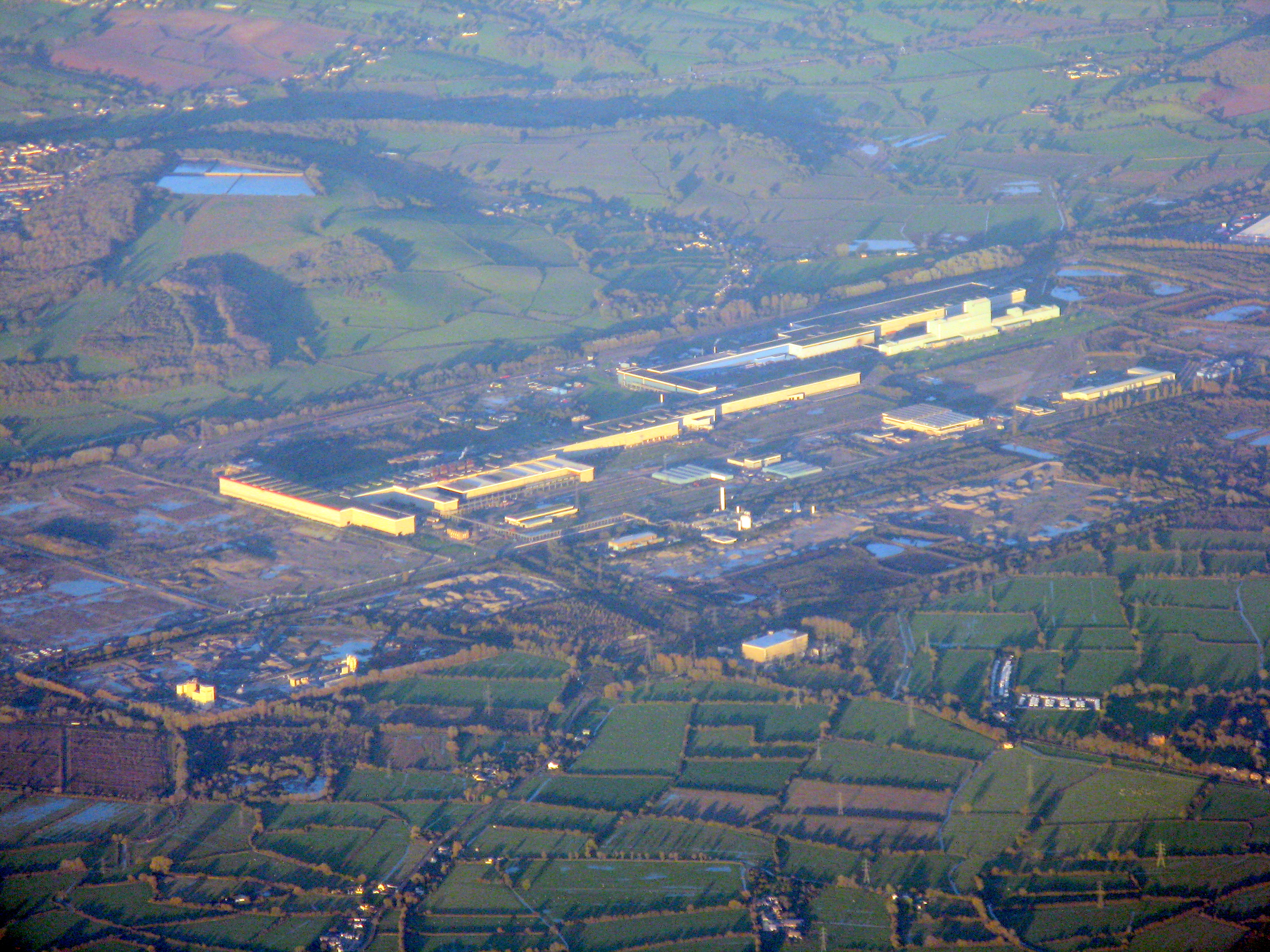
Llanwern steelworks

- 1963: Newport rugby club beats the touring New Zealand All Blacks.
- 2002: Newport granted city status; discovery of the Newport Ship.
- 2003: Newport Unlimited regeneration company set up.
- 2010: The Ryder Cup golf competition was hosted at the Celtic Manor Resort.
- 2013: Hartridge High School reopens as Llanwern High School in a new £29m building.
- 2014: The 2014 NATO summit takes place at the Celtic Manor Resort.
- 2015: Friars Walk shopping centre opens.
- 2019: The International Convention Centre Wales opens at the Celtic Manor Resort.
- 2019: Railway electrification reaches Newport, as part of the 21st-century modernisation of the Great Western main line.

== Governance and politics ==
See also Category:Politics of Newport, Wales

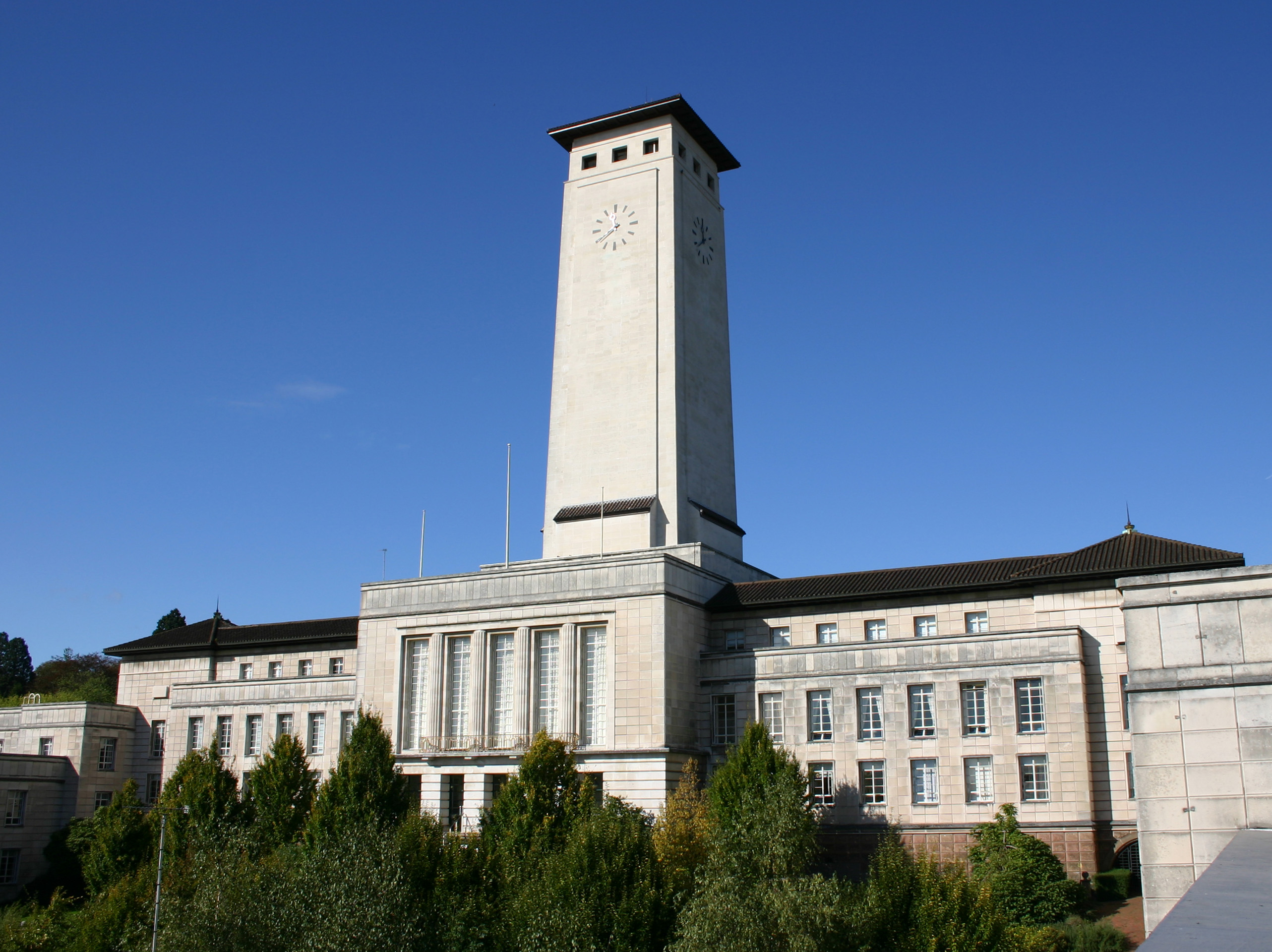
The Art Deco Newport Civic Centre

Newport has long been the largest town in the historic county of Monmouthshire, and was a county borough between 1891 and 1974. The Local Government Act 1972 removed ambiguity about the legal status of the area by including the administrative county of Monmouthshire and the county borough of Newport into all acts pertaining to Wales. In 1974, the borough was incorporated into the new local government county of Gwent until Newport became a unitary authority again in 1996. Gwent remains in use for ceremonial functions as a preserved county.

Historically built on shipping and industry, Newport's political representation across its constituencies and council wards has traditionally varied between urban industrial areas and suburban residential wards.

The district was formed by the Local Government Act 1972 from the county borough of Newport, the Caerleon Urban District and Magor and St Mellons Rural District (except the parishes of Henllys and St Mellons) from the administrative county of Monmouthshire.

The right to use the armorial bearings of the Newport Corporation which were lost when the corporation was abolished on 1 April 1974 were only officially transferred to the new authority on 14 March 1996, some 18 days before it too was abolished. The present city council was awarded the right to use the arms on 26 July 1996.

=== Council ===
Newport City Council consists of 53 elected councillors. The Labour Party won the 2022 election with 35 seats, ahead of the Conservative Party with 7 seats.

Labour lost control of the council in the 2008 local elections to a Conservative/Liberal Democrat coalition but Labour regained an overall majority of councillors in the 2012 election, continuing until the present day.

=== Senedd ===
In the Senedd, Newport represented by the Senedd constituency of Casnewydd Islwyn, electing six Members of the Senedd (MSs).

The constituency is represented by the following MSs:

- Lyn Ackerman (Plaid Cymru)
- Natasha Asghar (Welsh Conservatives)
- Jayne Bryant (Welsh Labour)
- Peredur Owen Griffiths (Plaid Cymru)
- Dan Thomas (Reform UK)
- Art Wright (Reform UK)

Casnewydd Islwyn crosses a boundary with Caerphilly County Borough.

=== UK Parliament ===
In UK general elections the City of Newport is in two UK Parliament constituencies. Due to boundary changes the Newport West constituency was renamed Newport West and Islwyn for the 2024 general election. In 2024 the Labour Party won both the expanded Newport East constituency and the new Newport West and Islwyn constituency.

Until 2024, the city was divided between the UK Parliament constituencies of Newport East and Newport West and elected one Member of Parliament (MP) for each constituency. The Labour Party held Newport East since constituency boundaries were redrawn in 1983 and held Newport West since 1987.

The city formerly had only one constituency, Newport (Monmouthshire), until 1983 when the city was split into Newport East and Newport West due to population growth.

The two UK Parliament constituencies covering Newport (in pink) from 2024. 1 = Newport West and Islwyn, and 2 = Newport East.

=== European Parliament ===
Prior to Brexit in 2020, Newport was part of the Wales European Parliament Constituency. The constituency elected four Members of the European Parliament (MEP) on a proportional representation basis. In the 2019 European Parliament election the Wales constituency elected one MEP from the Labour Party, one from Plaid Cymru and two from the Brexit Party.

=== Elected representatives ===
| Position | |
|---|---|
| Members of Newport City Council | 51 Councillors elected 2022 including Council Leader: Dimitri Batrouni, Labour Party, appointed Leader in 2024 |
| Members of the Senedd | Newport East: John Griffiths, Labour Party, first elected 1999; Newport West: Jayne Bryant, Labour Party, first elected 2016 |
| Members of UK Parliament | Newport East: Jessica Morden, Labour Party, first elected 2005; Newport West and Islwyn: Ruth Jones, Labour Party, first elected 2019 (Newport West constituency) |
| Gwent Police and Crime Commissioner | Gwent Police: Jane Mudd, Labour Party, first elected 2024 |

=== Coat of arms ===
The official blazon of the armorial bearings is: "(arms) Or, a chevron reversed gules, the shield ensigned by a cherub proper. Supporters: on the dexter side a winged sea lion Or, and on the sinister side a sea dragon gules, the nether parts of both proper, finned gold."

=== Freedom of the City ===
The title of Freedom of Newport is a ceremonial honour, given by the Newport council to those who have served in some exceptional capacity, or upon any whom Newport wishes to bestow an honour. There have been 17 individuals or organisations that have received the honour since 1909, including:

- Godfrey Charles Morgan, 1st Viscount Tredegar, Lord Lieutenant of Monmouthshire
- Bernard Montgomery, 1st Viscount Montgomery of Alamein (1945)
- Corps of the South Wales Borderers (24th Foot)
- Royal Regiment of Wales (24th/41st Foot)
- 104th Regiment Royal Artillery (Volunteers)
- Royal Welch Fusiliers (2001)
- British Merchant Navy Association
- HMS Severn (2006)
- Newport County A.F.C. (2013)
- Newport R.F.C. (2013)
- Royal British Legion (2021)

== Geography ==
Newport is located 138 mi (222 km) west of London and 12 mi (19 km) east of Cardiff. It is the largest urban area within the historic county boundaries of Monmouthshire and the preserved county of Gwent. The City of Newport, which includes rural areas as well as the built up area, is the sixth most populous unitary authority in Wales.

The city is largely low-lying, but with a few hilly areas. Wentwood is 1,014 ft (309 m) above sea level. Areas in the south and east of the city tend to be flat and fertile with some housing estates and industrial areas reclaimed from marshland. Areas near the banks of the River Usk, such as Caerleon, are also low-lying. The eastern outskirts of the city are characterised by the gently rolling hills of the Vale of Usk and Christchurch has panoramic views of the Vale of Usk and the Bristol Channel. Ridgeway at Allt-yr-yn also has good views of the surrounding areas and Bristol Channel. Brynglas has views over the city centre and Twmbarlwm to the west. The suburbs of the city have grown outwards from the inner-city, mostly near the main roads, giving the suburban sprawl of the city an irregular shape. The urban area is continuing to expand rapidly with new housing estates continuing to be built.

The city boundaries include a number of villages in the Newport Built-up area.

=== Wards and districts ===
See also Category:Districts of Newport, Wales

The city is divided into 21 wards. Most of these wards are coterminous with communities (parishes) of the same name. Each community can have an elected council. The following table lists city council wards, communities and associated geographical areas.

| Ward | Communities (Parishes) | Other geographic areas |
|---|---|---|
| Allt-yr-yn | Allt-yr-yn | Ridgeway, Barrack Hill, Glasllwch, Gold Tops |
| Alway | Alway | Somerton, Lawrence Hill |
| Beechwood | Beechwood | Eveswell |
| Bettws | Bettws | |
| Bishton and Langstone | Bishton*, Langstone*, Llanvaches*, Penhow* | Llanmartin, Parc Seymour, Wentwood Forest, Coed-y-caerau, Cat's Ash, Llanbedr, Whitebrook |
| Caerleon | Caerleon | Christchurch, Bulmore, Lodge Hill |
| Gaer | Gaer | Maesglas, Stelvio, St. Davids, Gaer Park |
| Graig | Graig* | Rhiwderin, Bassaleg, Lower Machen, Pentre Poeth, Fox Hill |
| Llanwern | Llanwern, Goldcliff, Whitson, Redwick | Underwood, Whitson, Uskmouth, Summerleaze, Wilcrick, Saltmarsh, Milton, Porton |
| Lliswerry | Lliswerry, Nash* | Broadmead Park, Moorland Park, Uskmouth, Broadstreet Common |
| Malpas | Malpas | Hollybush |
| Pillgwenlly | Pillgwenlly | Level of Mendalgief |
| Ringland | Ringland | Bishpool, Treberth, Coldra |
| Rogerstone East | Rogerstone* | High Cross, Cefn Wood, Croesllanfro, Mount Pleasant |
| Rogerstone North | | |
| Rogerstone West | | Afon Village |
| Shaftesbury | Shaftesbury | Brynglas, Crindau, Marshes, Blaen-y-pant |
| St. Julian's | St. Julian's | Riverside, Barnardtown |
| Stow Hill | Stow Hill | St. Woolos, Baneswell, City centre |
| Tredegar Park and Marshfield | Tredegar Park, Coedkernew*, Marshfield*, Michaelston-y-Fedw*, Wentlooge* | Duffryn, Castleton, St. Brides, Blacktown, Peterstone |
| Victoria | Victoria | Maindee, Summerhill |

* communities with a community council.

=== Climate ===
Newport has a moderate temperate climate, with the weather rarely staying the same for more than a few days at a time. The city is one of the sunnier locations in Wales and its sheltered location tends to protect it from extreme weather. Like the whole of the British Isles, Newport benefits from the warming effect of the Gulf Stream. Newport has mild summers and cool winters.

Thunderstorms may occur intermittently at any time of year, but are most common throughout late-spring and summer. Rain falls throughout the year, Atlantic storms give significant rainfall in the autumn, these gradually becoming rarer towards the end of winter. Autumn and summer have often been the wettest seasons in recent times. Snow falls in most winters and sometimes settles on the ground, usually melting within a few days. Newport records few days with gales compared to most of Wales, again due to its sheltered location. Frosts are common from October to May.

On 20 March 1930, the overnight temperature fell to −16.1 °C (3.0 °F) the coldest temperature for the whole of the UK during that year, and the latest date in spring the UK's lowest temperature has been recorded.

== Demography ==
Population pyramid of Newport in 2021

| Year | Population |
|---|---|
| 1801 | 6,657 |
| 1851 | 29,238 |
| 1881 | 48,069 |
| 1901 | 79,342 |
| 1941 | 116,434 |
| 1981 | 131,016 |
| 2001 | 137,017 |
| 2025 | 168,584 |

=== Religion ===
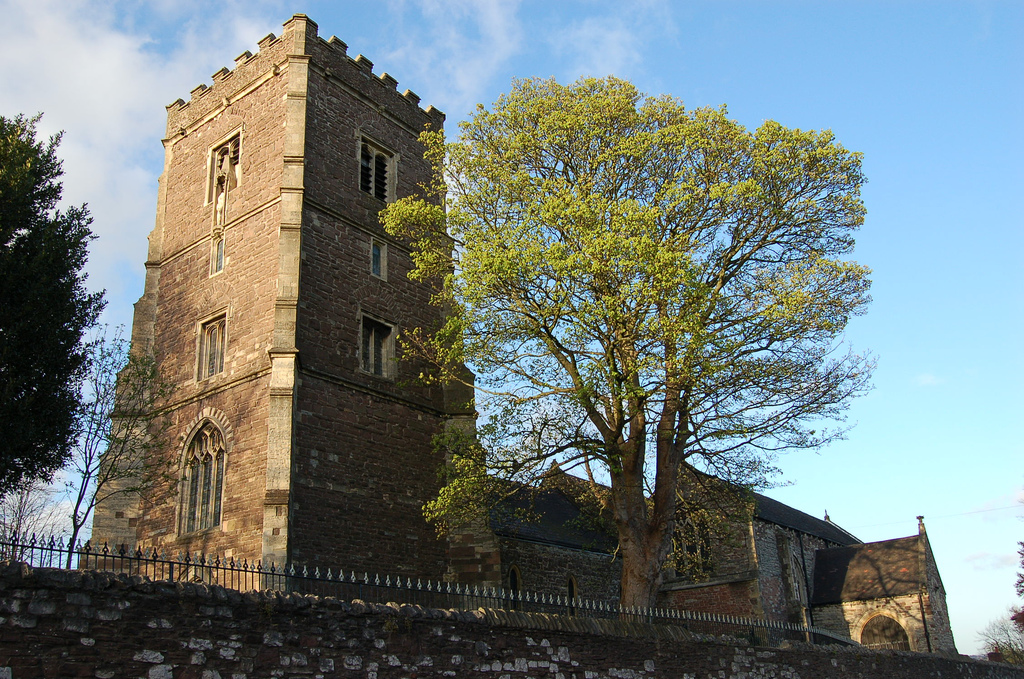
Newport Cathedral – St Woolos

In 1929 St Woolos Church became the Pro-Cathedral of the Diocese of Monmouth, becoming a full cathedral in 1949. When Rowan Williams was appointed Archbishop of Wales in 2000, the Cathedral became the Metropolitan Cathedral of Wales, as it had when previous Bishops of Monmouth were elected Archbishop.

In 1850 Newport was recognised as a centre of Catholicism in Wales when the Diocese of Newport and Menevia was created. Between 21 October 1966 and 6 October 1969, having retired as Bishop of Rochester, New York, Fulton J. Sheen, an American bishop who pioneered preaching on television and radio, was appointed the titular archbishop of Newport by Pope Paul VI. The Catholic St Patrick's Church was served by the Rosminians until the 2010s.

The foundation of the Charles Street Baptist Church was mainly the project of three women who had been members of Bethesda Baptist Chapel in Rogerstone, which was first built in 1742. In 1807 a Mrs Samuel and her friends rented a room in John Rowe's house on Stow Hill and asked the preachers John Hier, and his subordinate James Edmunds, both from Bethesda, to preach to them there. They later moved to a larger room in Charles Street. In 1816 a meeting at the Castleton Baptist Association agreed to build the first Welsh Baptist Chapel in Newport. Land was acquired in Charles Street, with the help of a bequest from Newport tailor John Williams. In May 1817 the opening services of the new church were held. By July 1879 the decline in Welsh-speaking in the town led to a change in the services from Welsh to English. In September 1993, the Charles Street congregation joined with Ebbw Bridge Baptist Church, Newport, and the Charles Street Chapel closed.

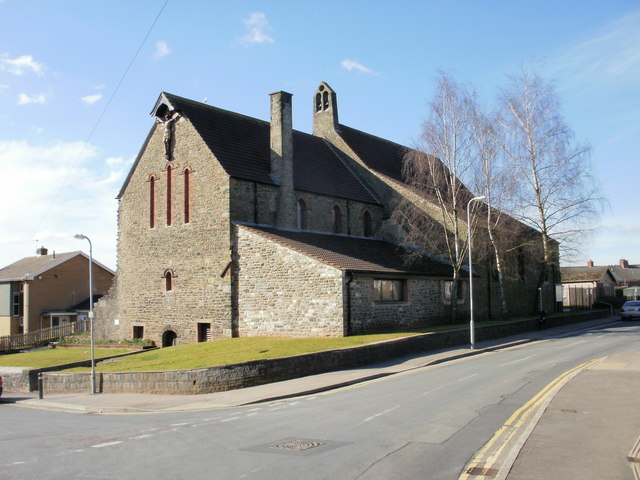
The Church in Wales church of SS. Julius and Aaron

In the 2021 census 43.0% of Newport residents reported having "No religion", making it the most common response in this local authority area (up from 29.7% in 2011). 42.8% of Newport residents considered themselves Christian (58.9% in 2011), 7,1% Muslim (up from 4,7%), 1.7% other religions (including Hindu, Buddhist, Sikh, Jewish and Others) (previously 1.2%). 5.6% (7.5%) chose not to answer the non-compulsory religion question on the census.

Newport has more than 50 churches, 7 mosques, and one synagogue; the nearest Gurudwara is in Cardiff.

The Church in Wales church of St Julius and St Aaron, at St Julian's, was consecrated in 1926.

The following table shows the religious identity of residents residing in Newport according to the 2001, 2011 and the 2021 censuses.

| Religion | 2001 | | 2011 | | 2021 | |
| Religion | Number | % | Number | % | Number | % |
|---|---|---|---|---|---|---|
| No religion | 22,963 | 16.8 | 43,336 | 29.7 | 68,564 | 43.0 |
| Christian | 98,484 | 71.9 | 82,858 | 56.9 | 68,287 | 42.8 |
| Muslim | 3,492 | 2.5 | 6,859 | 4.7 | 11,280 | 7.1 |
| Religion not stated | 11,135 | 8.1 | 10,935 | 7.1 | 8,977 | 5.6 |
| Hindu | 231 | 0.2 | 685 | 0.5 | 761 | 0.5 |
| Other religion | 294 | 0.2 | 463 | 0.3 | 739 | 0.5 |
| Buddhism | 240 | 0.2 | 360 | 0.2 | 479 | 0.3 |
| Sikh | 85 | 0.1 | 141 | 0.1 | 415 | 0.3 |
| Jewish | 87 | 0.1 | 99 | 0.1 | 90 | 0.1 |
| Total | 137,011 | 100.00% | 145,736 | 100.00% | 159,600 | 100.0% |

=== Ethnicity ===
In the 2011 census, 89.9% described themselves as White, 5.5% Asian, 1.7% Black, 1.1% Mixed White/Black, 0.5% Mixed White/Asian and 1.4% as other ethnic groups. In the 2021 census, Whites had decreased to 85.6% of the population while all other groups increased bar Black Caribbeans.

| Ethnic Group | Year | | | | | | | |
| Ethnic Group | 1991 | | 2001 | | 2011 | | 2021 | |
| Ethnic Group | Number | % | Number | % | Number | % | Number | % |
| White: Total | 128,694 | 96.5% | 130,408 | 95.2% | 131,025 | 90% | 136,473 | 85.6% |
|---|---|---|---|---|---|---|---|---|
| White: British | – | – | 127,563 | 93.1% | 126,756 | 87% | 128,245 | 80.4% |
| White: Irish | – | – | 1,045 | | 769 | | 685 | 0.4% |
| White: Gypsy or Irish Traveller | – | – | – | – | 84 | | 168 | 0.1% |
| White: Roma | – | – | – | – | – | – | 406 | 0.3% |
| White: Other | – | – | 1,800 | | 3,416 | | 6,969 | 4.4% |
| Asian or Asian British: Total | 3,024 | 2.2% | 3,873 | 2.8% | 7,986 | 5.5% | 12,194 | 7.6% |
| Asian or Asian British: Indian | 386 | | 402 | | 1,218 | | 2,023 | 1.3% |
| Asian or Asian British: Pakistani | 1570 | | 1,958 | | 3,127 | | 4,803 | 3.0% |
| Asian or Asian British: Bangladeshi | 552 | | 867 | | 1,749 | | 2,858 | 1.8% |
| Asian or Asian British: Chinese | 250 | | 296 | | 600 | | 711 | 0.4% |
| Asian or Asian British: Other Asian | 266 | | 350 | | 1,292 | | 1,799 | 1.1% |
| Black or Black British: Total | 889 | 0.7% | 734 | 0.5% | 2,535 | 1.7% | 3,737 | 2.3% |
| Black or Black British: African | 155 | | 242 | | 1,499 | | 2,687 | 1.7% |
| Black or Black British: Caribbean | 449 | | 418 | | 782 | | 553 | 0.3% |
| Black or Black British: Other Black | 285 | | 74 | | 254 | | 497 | 0.3% |
| Mixed or British Mixed: Total | – | – | 1,635 | 1.1% | 2,752 | 1.9% | 4,451 | 2.8% |
| Mixed: White and Black Caribbean | – | – | 745 | | 1,318 | | 1,528 | 1.0% |
| Mixed: White and Black African | – | – | 182 | | 360 | | 640 | 0.4% |
| Mixed: White and Asian | – | – | 426 | | 669 | | 1,188 | 0.7% |
| Mixed: Other Mixed | – | – | 282 | | 405 | | 1,095 | 0.7% |
| Other: Total | 711 | 0.5% | 361 | 0.3% | 1,438 | 1% | 2,737 | 1.7% |
| Other: Arab | – | – | – | – | 926 | | 999 | 0.6% |
| Other: Any other ethnic group | 711 | 0.5% | 361 | 0.3% | 512 | | 1,738 | 1.1% |
| Ethnic minority: Total | 4,624 | 3.5% | 6,603 | 4.8% | 14,711 | 10% | 23,119 | 15.4% |
| Total | 133,318 | 100% | 137,011 | 100% | 145,736 | 100% | 159,592 | 100% |

== Economy ==
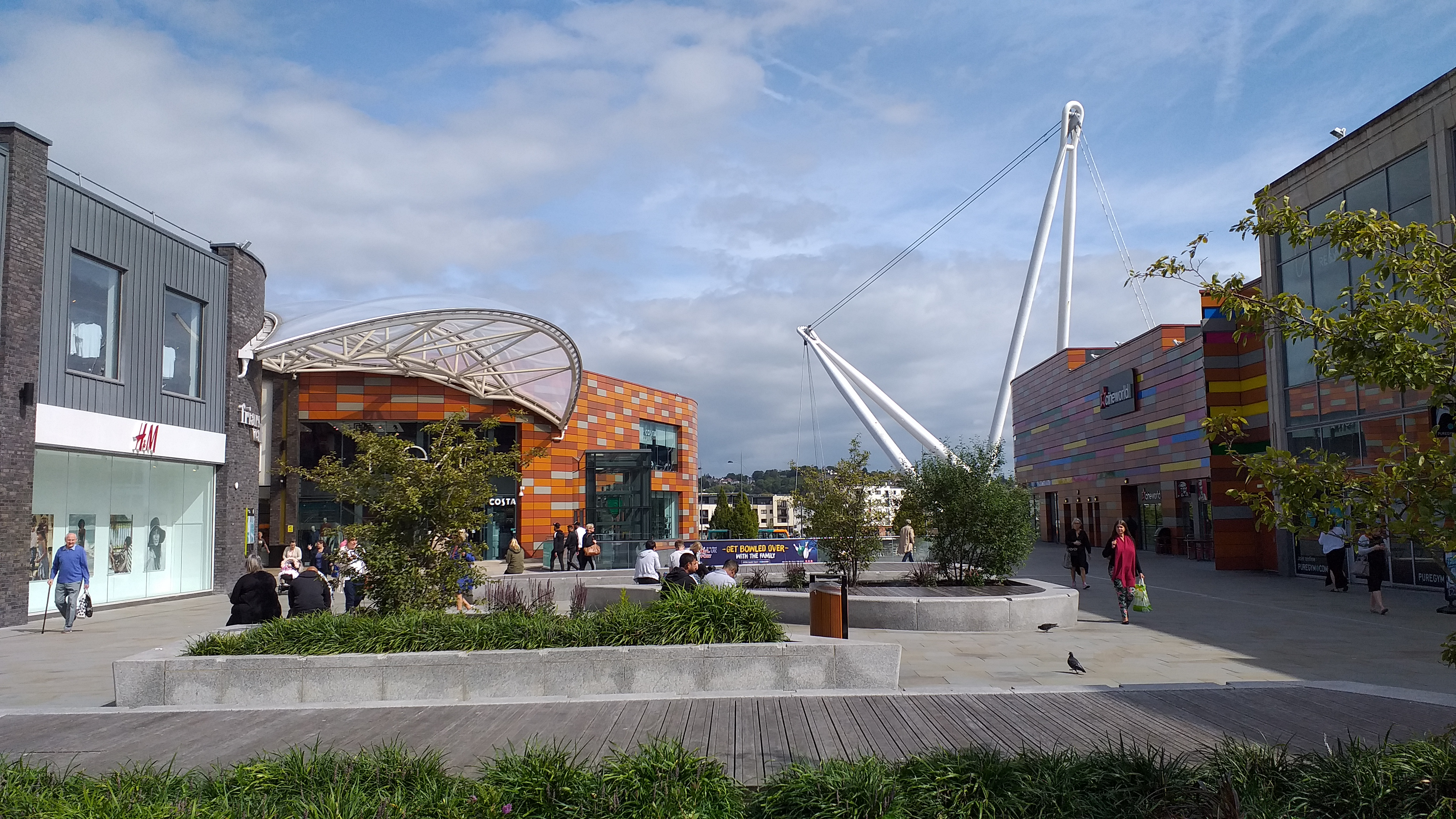
Friars Walk

Newport's travel to work area incorporates much of south Monmouthshire; the new 2001-based area also includes Cwmbran. The city itself has three major centres for employment: the city centre, and business parks clustered around the M4 motorway junctions 24 in the east and 28 in the west.

Organisations based in the city include Airbus Defence and Space; KLA; Safran; the headquarters of the Office for National Statistics; the headquarters of the United Kingdom Intellectual Property Office (formerly known as the Patent Office); the General Insurance Division of Lloyds Banking Group; Acquis Insurance Management; Vantage Data Centers; a semiconductor plant for Vishay Intertechnology; the headquarters of insurance comparison site Gocompare; NFU Mutual; Walters Group civil engineers; SSCL; the headquarters of Wales and West Utilities; Dŵr Cymru Welsh Water; the shared-service centre for HM Prison Service; the Passport Office for much of the south and west of the UK; and the Wales headquarters of the Charity Commission and British Red Cross. In 2014 Admiral Insurance opened a large newly constructed office opposite Newport railway station.

In 1997, Newport secured what was then thought to be Europe's largest-ever inward investment when the LG Group announced a £1.7 billion project creating 6,100 jobs, and supported by public sector grants. Facilities were built on the Celtic Lakes business and science park, but market conditions led to the semiconductor plant never opening, and the CRT plant eventually closed in 2003. In 2005 Irish radiator manufacturer Quinn Group bought the former LG Phillips building, which became its European base.

Industry in the east of Newport was formerly based at the Corus Llanwern steelworks, and although the rolling mill is still active, steel manufacture ceased in 2001. Permission has been granted to transform the 600-acre (240 ha) former steelworks site into a £1bn mixed-use development comprising housing, office and industrial space, public open space and a range of community facilities.

At the mouth of the River Usk, the Sims Metal Management plant hosts the world's largest industrial shredder for scrap metal with access by road, rail and sea. The plant, which is also the world's largest car crusher which was featured in the TV series 'How do they do it'.

Newport Cattle Market, in the Pillgwenlly area of the city, closed in 2009 and was demolished to make way for a new supermarket.

On 17 February 2024 workers from Llanwern steelworks marched in the city centre to protest at the proposed loss of thousands of steel jobs at Port Talbot.

== Regeneration ==
The city has seen major regeneration projects being undertaken in recent years.

=== Infrastructure ===
The first stage of regeneration involved improving the city centre road network, turning Kingsway and Queensway into boulevards. The Southern Distributor Road to the south of the city opened in 2004, including the new City Bridge over the River Usk, improving access and opening up new areas for development. The Newport City footbridge opened in 2006 linking the east and west banks of the river for pedestrians and cyclists.

Newport railway station was expanded in 2007 to four full size platforms capable of receiving 10 car Class 800 trains. In 2010 a new station building was finished, carried out by engineering firm Atkins. During construction it was Wales' most environmentally friendly station work, using a hypermodern green ETFE structure similar to the materials used in the Eden Project and the Beijing Olympics' 'Water Cube'. In 2019 railway electrification and resigning work was completed, completing the 21st-century modernisation of the Great Western Main Line and reducing journey times to London to 1 hour 30 minutes.

Newport bus station was redeveloped in 2013, expanded in 2015 with the Friars Walk development, and now offers 24 stands connecting to the rest of the city, as well as Cardiff and Bristol. Local railway stations are reopening, starting with Rogerstone station in 2008, Pye Corner station in 2014, and with three others planned in the city's Unitary Development Plan. Transport for Wales intend to restart services between Newport and Ebbw Vale Parkway by 2021.

The Royal Gwent Hospital was downgraded to a minor injuries unit in 2020 when the new Grange University Hospital (Ysbyty Athrofaol Y Faenor) was opened at Llanfrechfa, near Cwmbran. There had been proposals to use the former Corus Steel Whiteheads site, close to the existing Royal Gwent site, for a replacement hospital but this was considered to have the same access and space restrictions as the current hospital. It was decided to redevelop the Llanfrechfa Grange Hospital site, a former mental health and disabilities residential centre near Cwmbran, as a specialist and critical care unit.

The M4 relief road skirting the southern edge of the urban area of Newport was proposed as a means of reducing the congestion on the existing M4 motorway (presently squeezed through the Brynglas Tunnels) and making Newport and the surrounding areas more accessible for motorised vehicles. The relief road scheme was cancelled in July 2009 but relaunched in 2014. A final decision not to proceed with the scheme was announced by the then First Minister of Wales, Mark Drakeford, on 4 June 2019.

=== Leisure ===
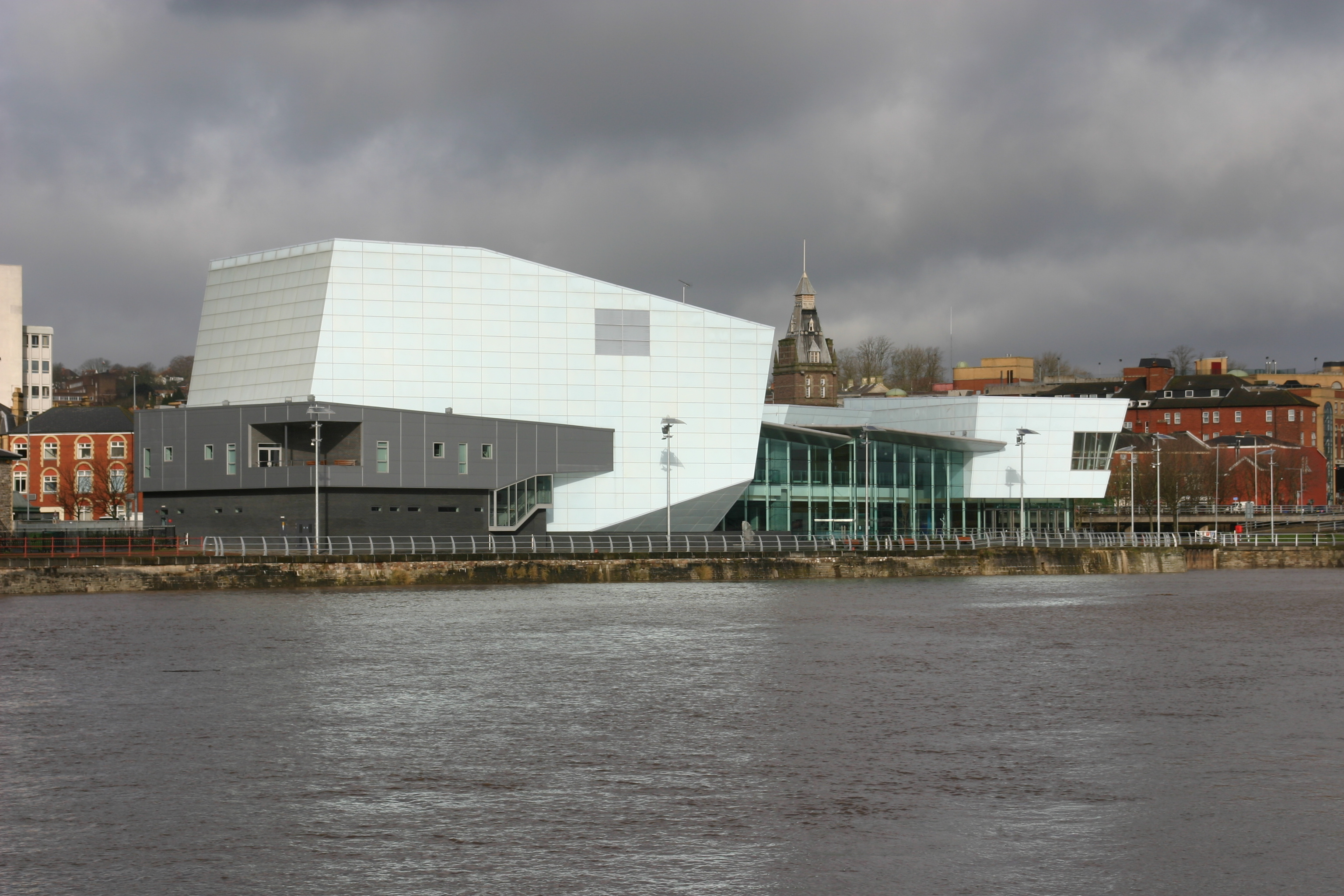
Riverfront Arts Centre next to the River Usk

The Riverfront Arts Centre was the first structure to be built as part of Newport's regeneration by Newport City Council in 2004. It stands on Kingsway on the west bank of the River Usk. On the east bank, Rodney Parade is home to the regional rugby union team Dragons and the English Football League team Newport County. Club rugby union side Newport RFC play at Newport Stadium.

=== Residential ===
Newport witnessed the fastest growth in property values in the UK during 2018,

As part of the city's master plan, the city centre has been expanded to take in areas of the River Usk east bank, with the area of land between Newport Bridge and George Street Bridge part of an ongoing £43 million high-density combined commercial and residential area, joined to the west bank by the new footbridge. The first phase has been labelled City Vizion.

The Newport Student Village is adjacent to the university campus on the west bank, as well as the "Newhaus" development of 154 riverside apartments. At the southern end of the site, the "Alexandra Gate" development includes 300 homes and riverside apartments built adjacent to the City Bridge.

In east Newport, land released from the Corus steelworks at Llanwern is being redeveloped as 4,000 houses, shops and other facilities.

=== Commercial ===
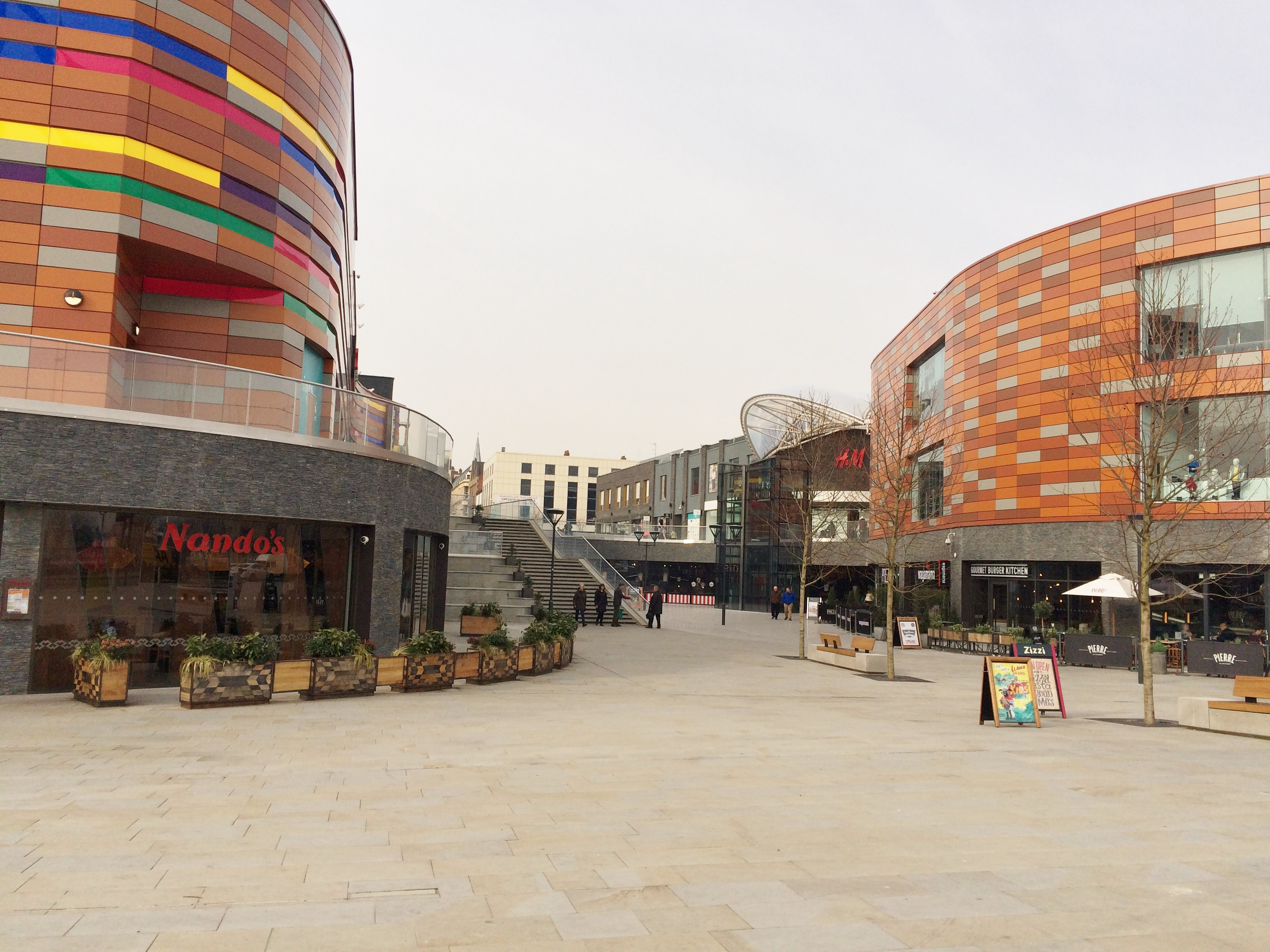
Usk Plaza, Friars Walk

The Newport retail environment faced challenges following the late-2000s recession, with major redevelopment projects heavily delayed.

Friars Walk shopping complex was first planned as a £210 million development ahead of the 2010 Ryder Cup, but faced numerous setbacks. The site opened to the public in November 2015 helped by £90 million of assistance from Newport Council to the developers, with the Debenhams flagship store. As well as 30 new shops, there are a dozen restaurants and an eight-screen Cineworld multiplex cinema. Plans for redevelopment of the smaller Cambrian Centre were approved in 2012.

Building on hosting the Ryder Cup in 2010 and the NATO Summit in 2014, the 5,000 capacity Celtic Manor International Conference Centre (ICC Wales) opened in 2019 as a conference venue for businesses and events in Wales and across the South West of England. It has hosted the UK Space Conference, BBC Cymru Wales broadcasts, and numerous national political conferences including hosting the Green Party of England and Wales and the UK Independence Party.

The 15-storey Chartist Tower was redeveloped by developers Garrison Barclay Estates as a 163-bedroom Mercure Hotel, offering views across the city and the Bristol Channel. The site will also include 25,000 sq ft of office space and 18,000 sq ft of retail space. The hotel development is seen as an important step towards meeting the additional demand for hotel space in Newport created by the International Convention Centre (ICC) Wales. The opening of the hotel was delayed by several months due to Wales' lockdown as a response to COVID-19 and opened in May 2022.

Newport Market was redeveloped as a £12 million mixed use site with a tech hub, apartments, market units, as well as a food court, a project led by Newport City Council and the proprietors of Tramshed Cardiff.

== Transport ==
See also Category:Transport in Newport, Wales

For those travelling west from England into Wales, Newport is the first major urban area one passes through. As a result, it is a convergence point for national road, bus, and rail routes.

=== Aviation ===
The nearest airport with scheduled domestic and international flights is Cardiff Airport, 30 mi (50 km) south-west of Newport. The airport is a 35-minute drive away from the city or a 55-minute train journey which involves changing at Cardiff Central for Vale of Glamorgan Line services to the nearby Rhoose Cardiff International Airport railway station. The airport is also accessible by transferring to 24-hour TrawsCymru T9 buses, which begin at Cardiff Central station.

In 2003, a proposal for a new Severnside airport near Newport was rejected by the Department for Transport. The airport would have featured runways on a man-made island in the Severn Estuary.

=== Buses ===
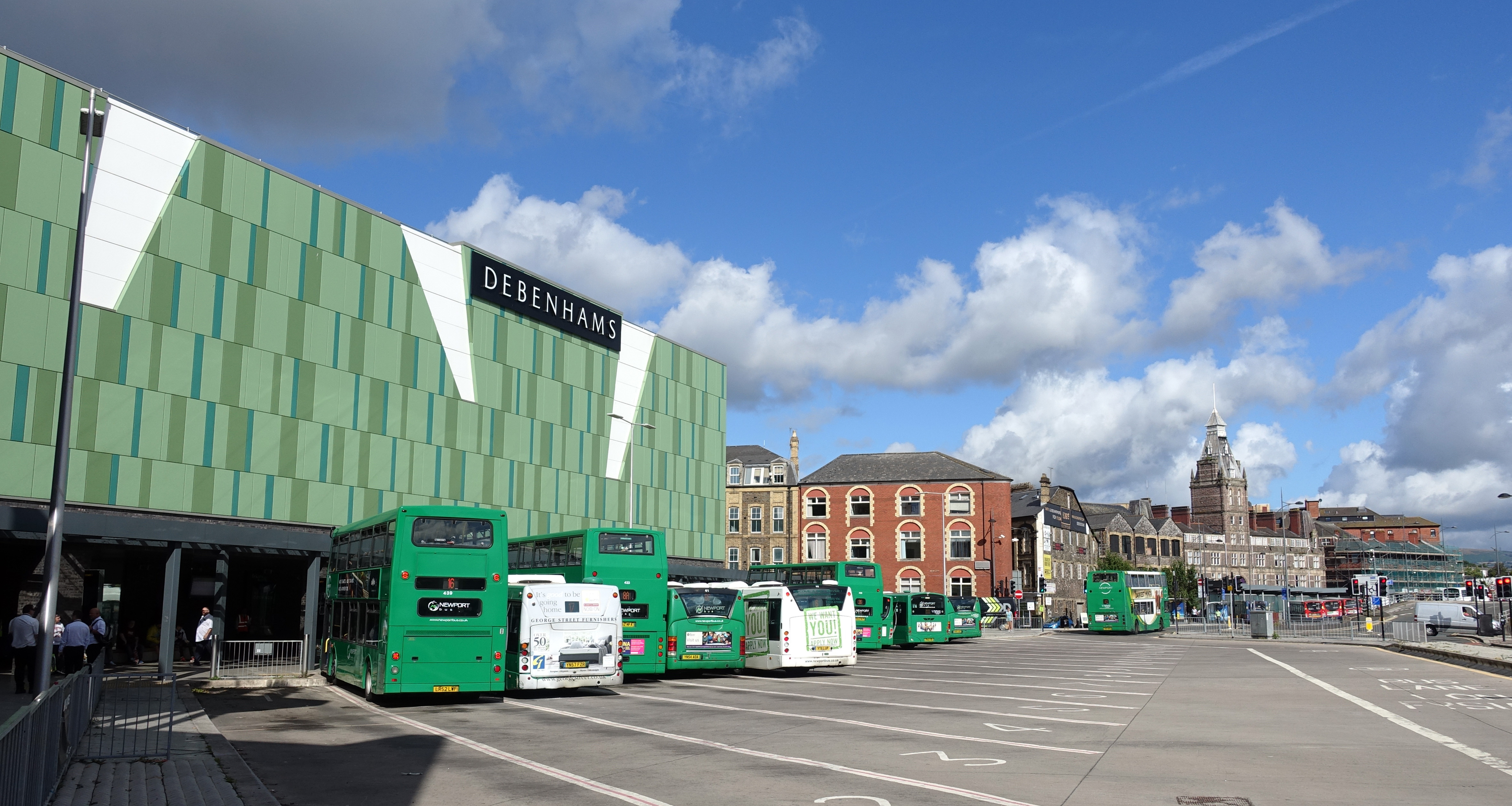
Newport bus station

Newport bus station is the largest bus interchange in the county, with 24 stands. It was built as part of the adjacent Friars Walk shopping centre and the station opened in December 2015.

Bus services are primarily provided by the municipally funded Newport Bus, and neighbouring firm Cardiff Bus. Other operators include Phil Anslow Coaches, Stagecoach in South Wales, New Adventure Travel, and until recently, First West of England.

Inter-city National Express services run from a stop near the Riverfront arts centre, opposite the bus station. has been now been redeveloped. National Express operate cross-country coach services from the city.

=== Railway ===
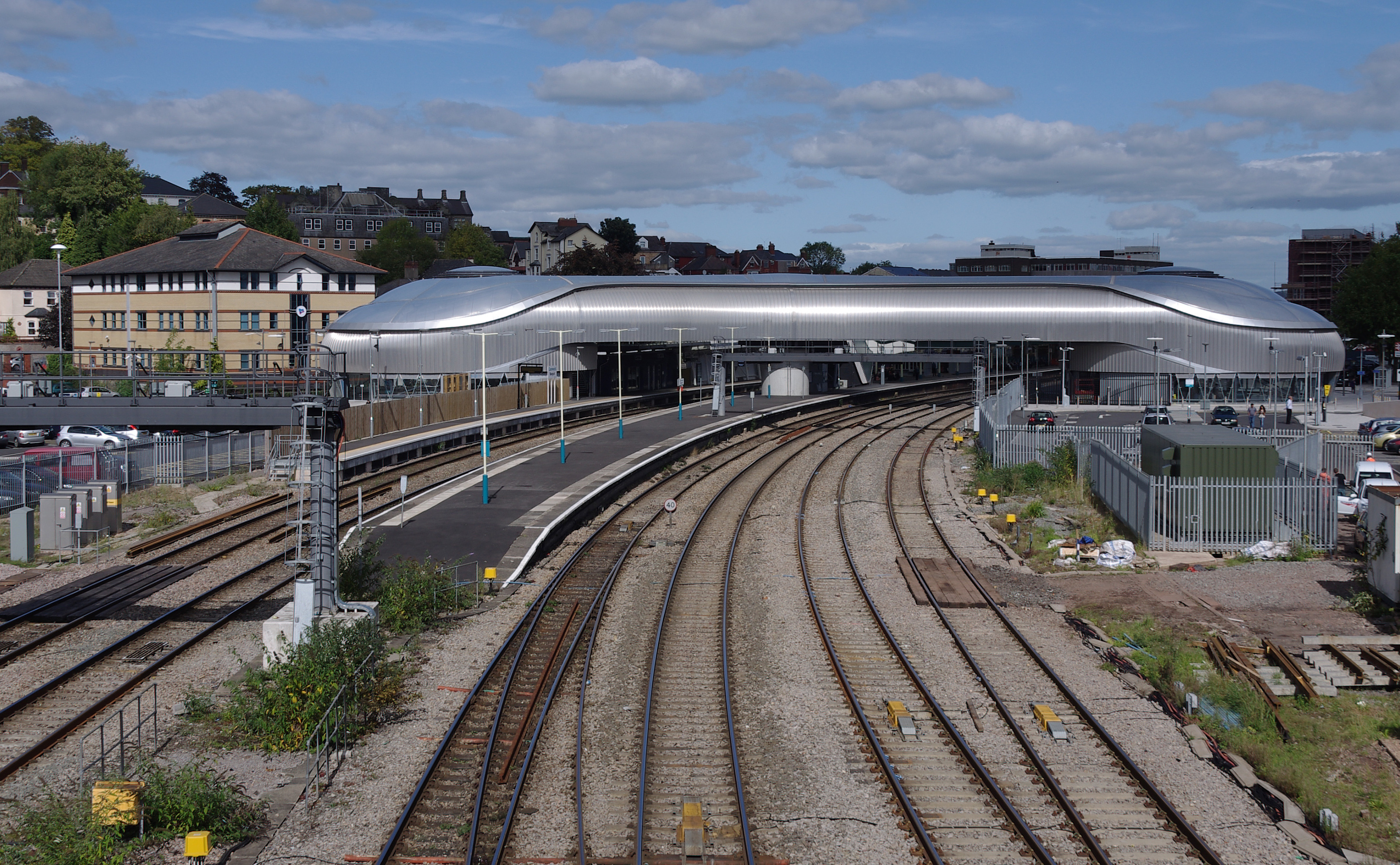
Newport railway station in 2011

Newport is the easternmost Welsh city on the United Kingdom rail network and has close proximity to major economic centres in Cardiff and Bristol. Newport railway station is the second-busiest station in Wales and, due to its interchange options, it serves as a major transfer station.

The Great Western Main Line connects the city with termini at Bristol Temple Meads, London Paddington and Pembroke Dock; the Welsh Marches line connects with Holyhead, Manchester Piccadilly and Llanelli; and the Gloucester line connects the borders region including Cheltenham. The Wessex Main Line also provides an hourly service from the city to Portsmouth. The station has four platforms and is a mandatory stop on all GWR services to and from London Paddington.

The city is well linked with the nearby Welsh capital Cardiff, with approximately six rail and five bus services between the cities every hour. Services to/from Bristol stop at Newport on average 2–3 times per hour, while there are nearly 4 services to/from London each hour.

==== Modernisation ====
The current Newport station was built in 2010, in a hypermodern green ETFE structure, after a £22 million refurbishment programme; it introduced the futuristic new passenger terminal and bridge, whilst restoring the 19th-century features of the site. The new complex, west of the old station entrance, includes two terminals, four full-size platforms, new terminal buildings and a public footbridge, a new passenger footbridge, a new taxi area, short-stay car park and a 250-space passenger car park.

The 21st-century modernisation of the Great Western main line programme has seen the installation of new facilities on platforms 2 and 3, including redesigned toilets, waiting rooms and covered areas.

Overhead line equipment has been installed through the city, as part of electrification of the London to Cardiff line, which allows the operation of Hitachi Intercity Express Programme trains. The new services are all-electric, with more seats and improvements to journey times between Newport and London of around 1 hour 30 minutes, including non-stop services after Wales between Bristol Parkway and London Paddington.

Rogerstone railway station, on the Ebbw Valley (Western Valleys) line, reopened in 2008 and Pye Corner, close to the site of the former Bassaleg railway station, opened around 2015. Transport for Wales services run between Ebbw Vale and Cardiff Central, and between Ebbw Vale and Newport, via Rogerstone and Pye Corner. Direct services between Ebbw Vale and Newport were reintroduced in early 2024 following work on local signalling.

There are active proposals from Grand Central to operate services from Llanelli, via Cardiff and Newport, to London Paddington, only stopping at Severn Tunnel Junction and Bristol Parkway instead of the current service which also calls at Didcot Parkway, Swindon and Reading.

==== Services ====
The services calling at Newport are:

- Great Western Railway
  - London Paddington – Reading – Bristol Parkway – Newport – Cardiff Central (– Bridgend – Port Talbot – Neath – Swansea)
  - Cardiff Central – Newport – Bristol Temple Meads – Bath Spa – Salisbury – Southampton – Portsmouth Harbour
  - Cardiff Central – Newport – Bristol Temple Meads – Weston-super-Mare – Taunton - Exeter St Davids - Plymouth.
- Transport for Wales
  - Manchester Piccadilly – Stockport – Crewe – Shrewsbury – Hereford – Cwmbran – Newport – Cardiff Central (– Bridgend – Port Talbot – Neath – Swansea – Carmarthen – Haverfordwest)
  - Cardiff Central – Newport – Cwmbran – Hereford – Shrewsbury – Wrexham General – Chester – Rhyl – Bangor – Holyhead
  - Maesteg – Bridgend – Cardiff Central – Newport – Chepstow – Gloucester – Cheltenham Spa
- CrossCountry
  - Cardiff Central – Newport – Gloucester – Cheltenham Spa – Birmingham New Street – Nottingham

=== Roads ===
==== M4 Motorway ====
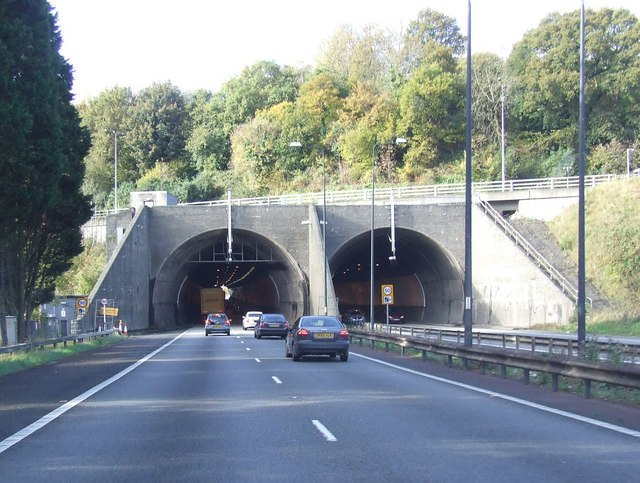
The Brynglas Tunnels in Newport are the only twin–bored tunnels in the UK motorway network

The M4 motorway junctions in and near the city area:

- 23A lies just outside the city boundaries and provides local access via the A4810 and B4245.
- 24: Coldra A449/A48/B4237
- 25: Caerleon Road B4596
- 25A: Grove Park A4042
- 26: Malpas Road A4051
- 27: High Cross, B4591
- 28: Tredegar Park A48/A4072 (A467/A468)
- 29: St Mellons A48(M) – no access from local roads

The Brynglas Tunnels are a cause of traffic delays as the M4 narrows to two lanes in both directions between junctions 25 and 26.

==== Southern Distributor Road ====
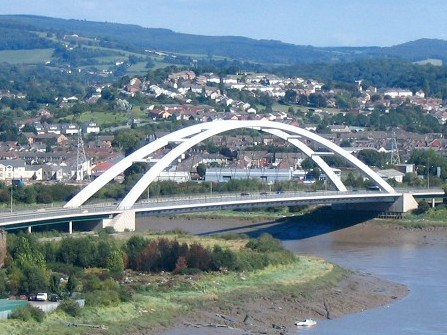
The City Bridge forms part of the Southern Distributor Road, spanning the River Usk

The Southern Distributor Road (SDR) is part of the A48 road and is a peripheral distributor road, which runs from Junction 24 of the M4 motorway in the east of Newport to Junction 28 in the west. Combined with the M4 in the north, the SDR forms the southern part of a ring road for the city.

==== Other routes ====
The major east–west A roads are:

- The A48 westbound (Southern Distributor Road - Cardiff Road to St Mellons) is as an alternative route from Newport to Cardiff.
- The A48 eastbound (Southern Distributor Road - Chepstow Road through Langstone) is as an alternative route from Newport to Chepstow, South West England (via the Severn Bridge), the Wye Valley and Gloucestershire.
- The A467 (Forge Road) from M4 junction 28 connects Newport to Risca and Ebbw Vale and, via the A468, to Machen and Caerphilly.
- The A4810 (Queen's Way) connects the SDR at Lee Way to the M4 at junction 23A through the Llanwern Steelworks.

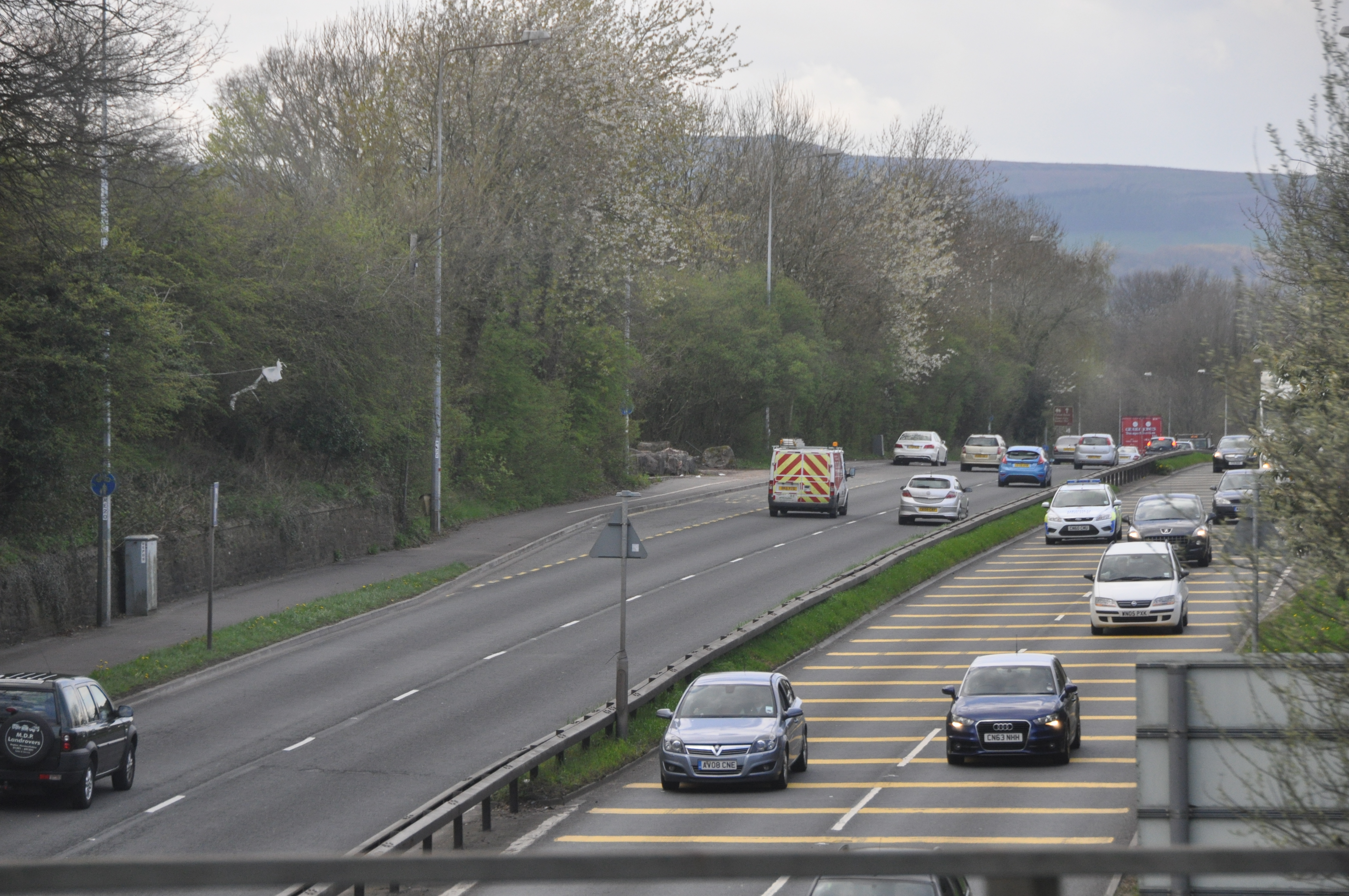
The A4072 (Forge Road)

The principal north-south A roads are:

- The A449 connects Newport to Usk and A40 to Gloucester and the English Midlands via M4 junction 24.
- The A4042 connects Newport to Cwmbran, Pontypool and Abergavenny via M4 junction 25A.
- The A4051 (Malpas Road) connects Newport to Cwmbran via M4 junction 26.

The B roads are:

- The B4237 (former A48) connects M4 junction 24 to junction 28 (Chepstow Road, Wharf Road, crossing George Street Bridge onto George Street and then Cardiff Road).
- The B4596 (Caerleon Road, former A4042) links central Newport to Caerleon via M4 Junction 25.
- The B4591 (Risca Road/Glasllwch Crescent/High Cross Road, former A467) is an alternative route from Newport to Risca via M4 Junction 27 (High Cross) and Rogerstone.
- The B4245 (Magor Road) at Langstone connects Newport to Underwood, Magor and Caldicot.
- The B4239 (Lighthouse Road) at Duffryn connects Newport to Rumney, Cardiff.

==== City centre ====
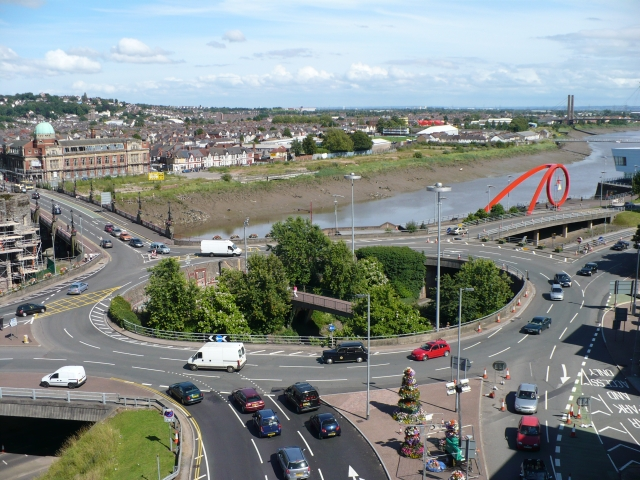
The Old Green Interchange

The Old Green Interchange is an elevated roundabout over the A4042 (Heidenheim Drive) at the western end of Newport Bridge. Newport's pedestrianised High Street runs southwest from the interchange through Westgate Square to the pedestrianised Commercial Street. Queensway passes Newport railway station and links the Old Green Interchange to Newport Civic Centre via Clytha Park Road. Kingsway/Usk Way is a boulevard on the west bank of the River Usk linking the Old Green Interchange to the Southern Distributor Road at the western end of City Bridge and to Newport Transporter Bridge.

Corporation Road follows the east bank of the River Usk, but with limited views of the river. It links Newport Bridge to George Street Bridge, Newport City Bridge and, via Stephenson Road, Newport Transporter Bridge.

== Notable buildings and structures ==
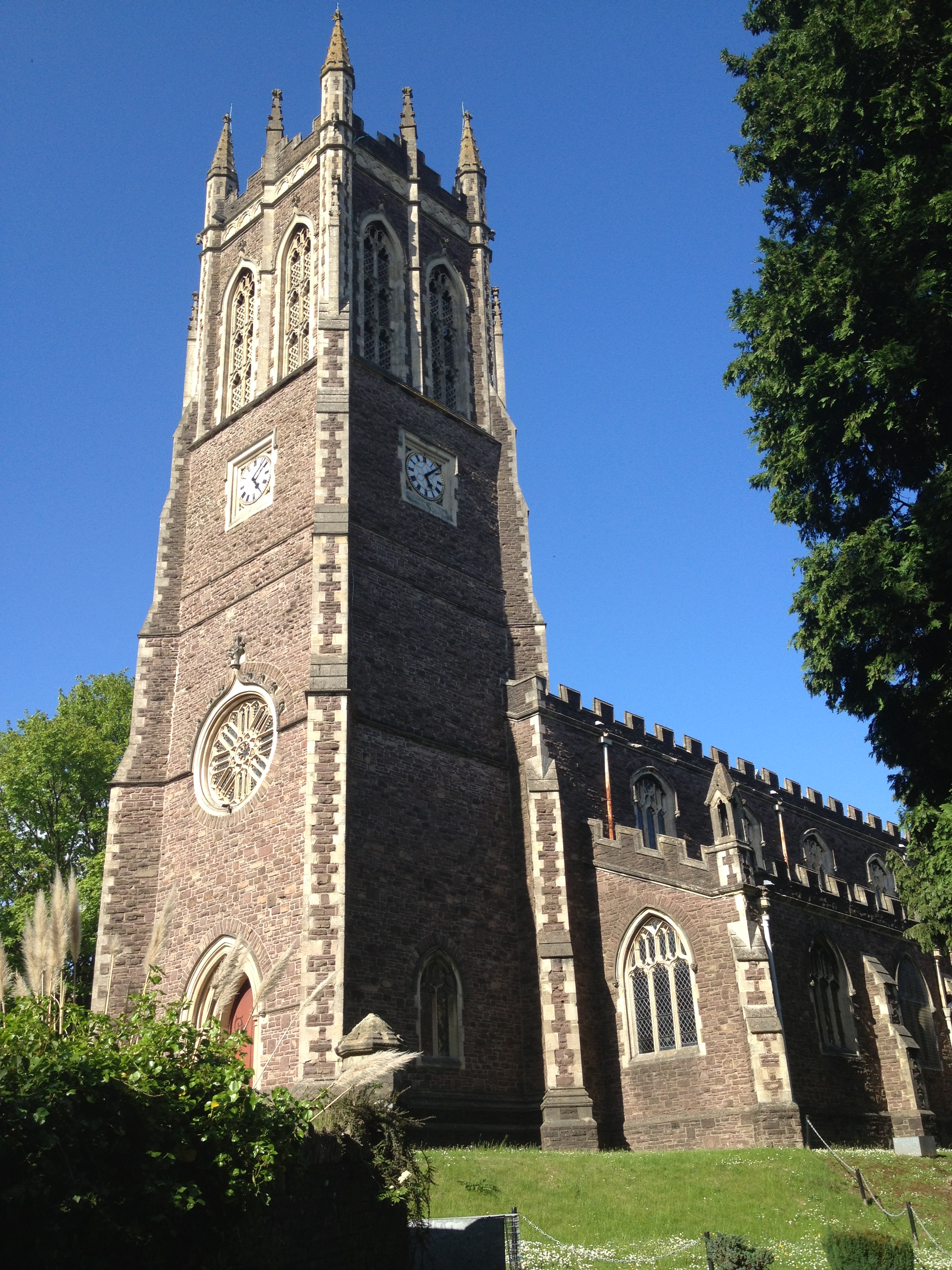
St Mark's Church

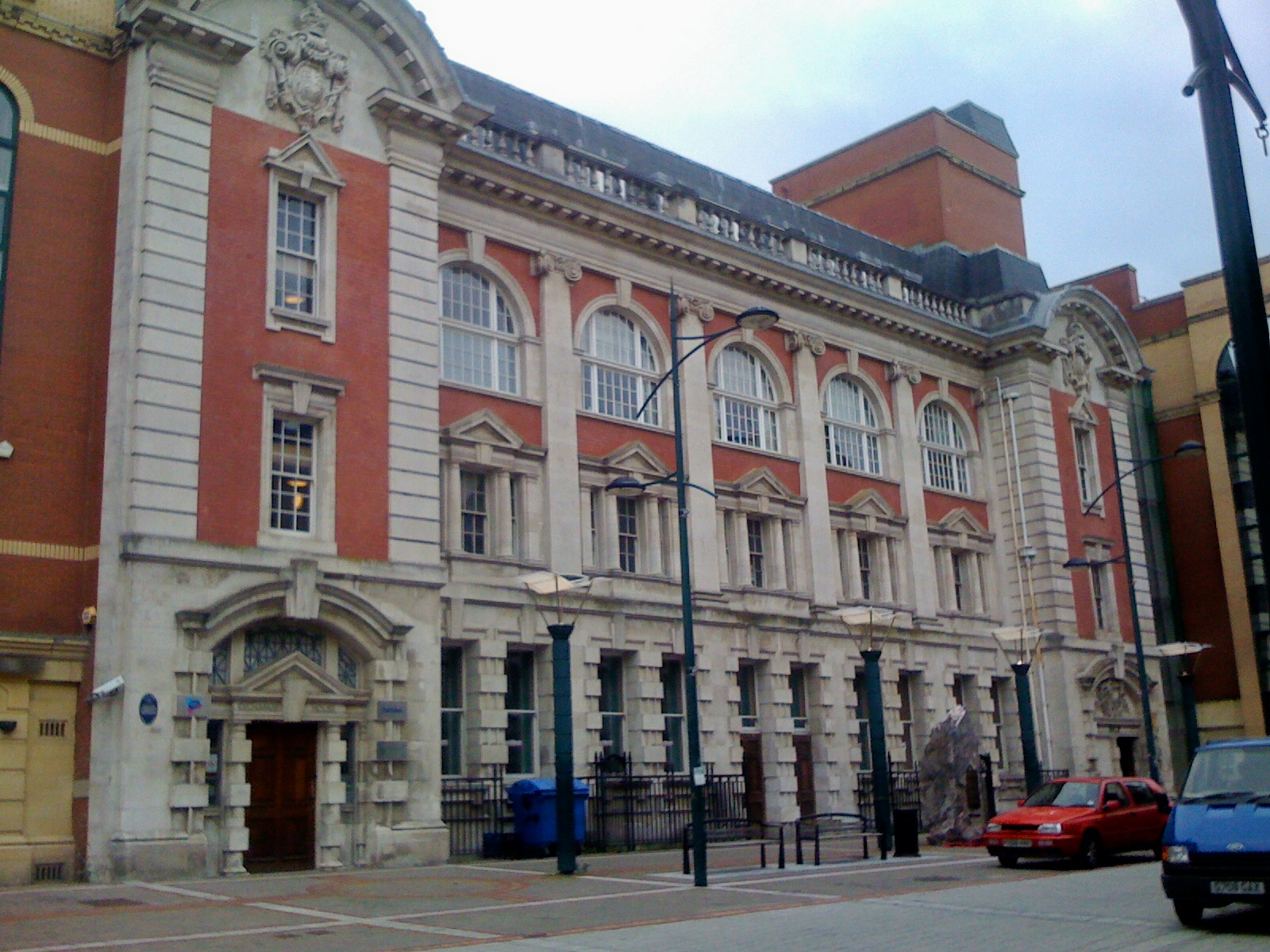
The façade of the former main Post Office, High Street

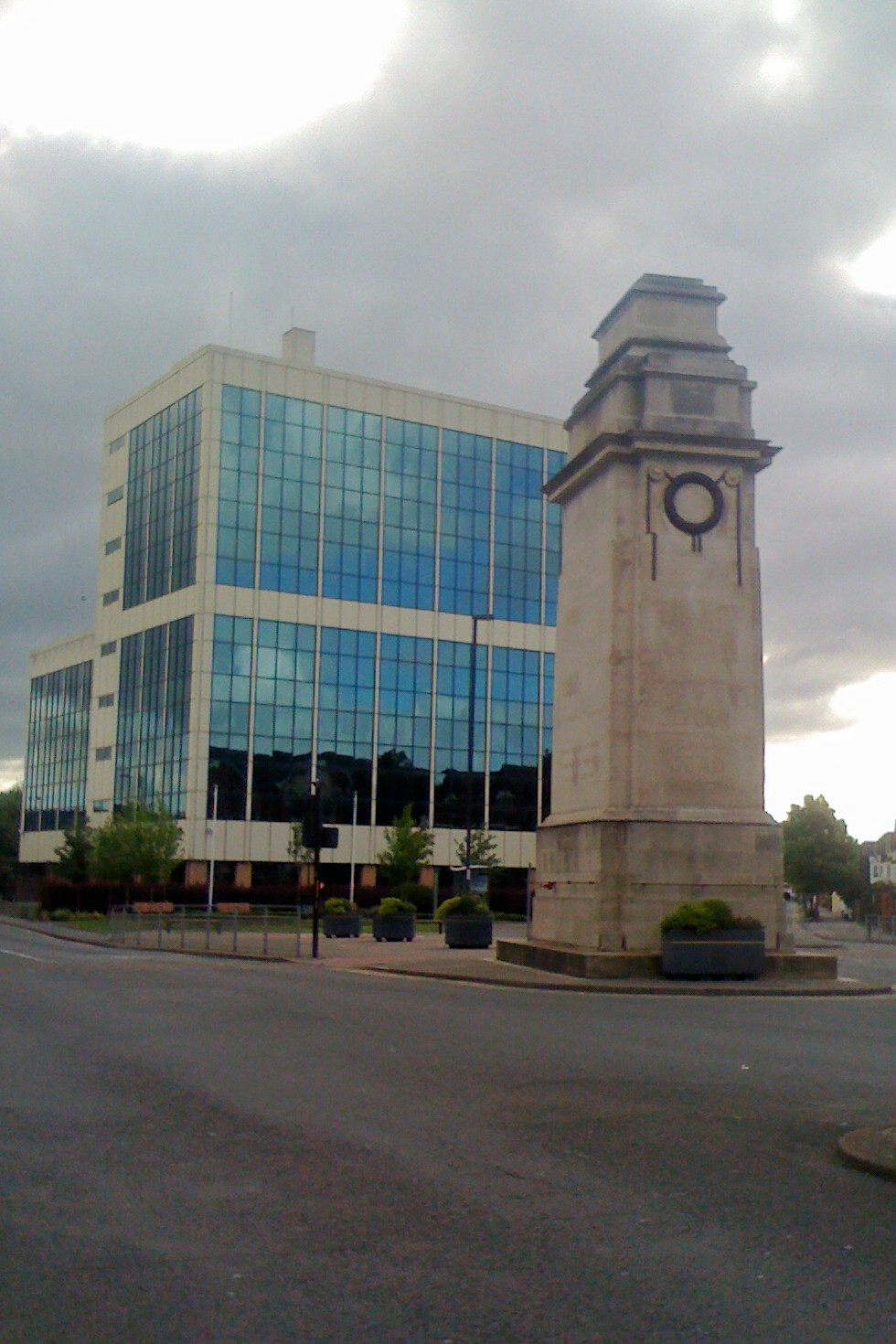
The Cenotaph, Clarence Place

See the following categories:

- Buildings and structures in Newport, Wales
- Landmarks in Newport, Wales
- Visitor attractions in Newport, Wales

Many of the landmarks of Newport are in Newport city centre or within a short walking distance of the centre; these include:

- Newport Cathedral (c. 400–500)
- Newport Castle (c. 1075)
- Newport Bridge (1800)
- Ye Olde Murenger House (1819)
- St Paul's Church (1835)
- Victoria Place (1840s)
- Newport railway station (1850, rebuilt 1930s and 2010)
- Newport Market (1854)
- St Mark's Church (1874)
- Rodney Parade (1875)
- Westgate Hotel (1881)
- Museum Art Gallery and Central Library (1968)
- Belle Vue Park (1891)
- Royal Gwent Hospital (1901, no original buildings remaining)
- Shire Hall (1902)
- Transporter Bridge (1906)
- Newport Technical Institute (former Art College) (1910)
- Civic Centre (1939)
- George Street Bridge (1964)
- Dolman Theatre (1967)
- Newport Crown Court (1991)
- Newport City Bridge (2004)
- Riverfront Arts Centre (2004)
- Newport City footbridge (2006)
- University of South Wales, Newport Campus (2011)

The city has a number of churches of architectural merit.

Other landmarks include:

- West Usk Lighthouse – operating as a hotel.
- Beechwood House – at Beechwood Park.
- Brynglas House – operating as an adult-education centre.
- Church of St Mary, Nash – the 12th-century parish church of Nash near Newport described by local historian Fred Hando as "the Cathedral of the Moors".
- Lysaght Institute – former working men's club for steelworkers when the Orb Works steel plant moved from Wolverhampton. Built 1928, refurbished 2012.
- Isca Augusta – extensive remains of a Roman fortress in the village of Caerleon including a baths, amphitheatre, and barracks. The site of the Cadw Roman Legion museum.
- Hanbury Arms, a pub in Caerleon which was noted as the place where Alfred, Lord Tennyson wrote Idylls of the King.
- Corn Exchange – The Corn exchange located on High Street, which reopened as a music venue in 2024.
- Newport Cenotaph – World War I and World War II memorial in Clarence Place.
- Main Post Office – a retained façade of the former main Post Office building in High Street adjacent to the old Corn Exchange. A blue plaque states: "Site of Newport's first Head Post Office. Built in 1844 and rebuilt in 1907, the Edwardian façade being preserved in the total reconstruction of the island site in 2001. Once housed the town's first telephone exchange, known as The Savoy. Listed Grade II in 1985."
- The Kings Hotel – former hotel in High Street dated c. 1812, now redeveloped as apartments
- Newport Arcade – Victorian arcade linking High Street to Cambrian Road.
- Market Arcade – Victorian arcade linking High Street to Market Street.
- Waterloo Hotel – Grade II-listed building in Alexandra Road, Pillgwenlly, currently operating as a bistro.
- Masonic Hall – Grade II-listed building at 109 Lower Dock Street.
- Burton Almshouses – almhouses, located on Friars Road, and Victoria Almshouses, Stow Hill, built 1900.
- The Old Rising Sun – former public house on Shaftesbury Street, Shaftesbury
- An unusual cylindrical former electricity transformer (1891), situated in Park Square.

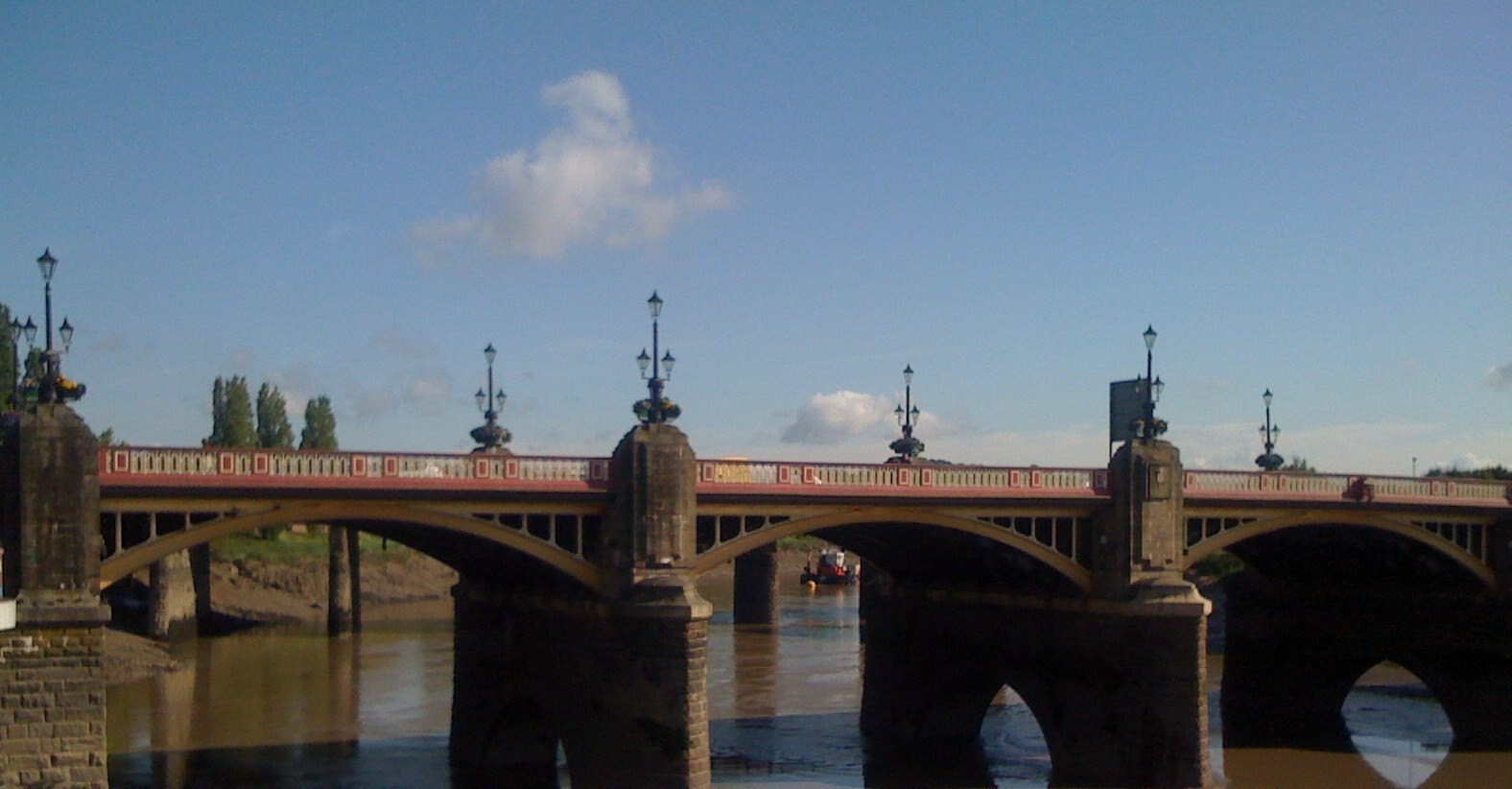
Newport Bridge 2011

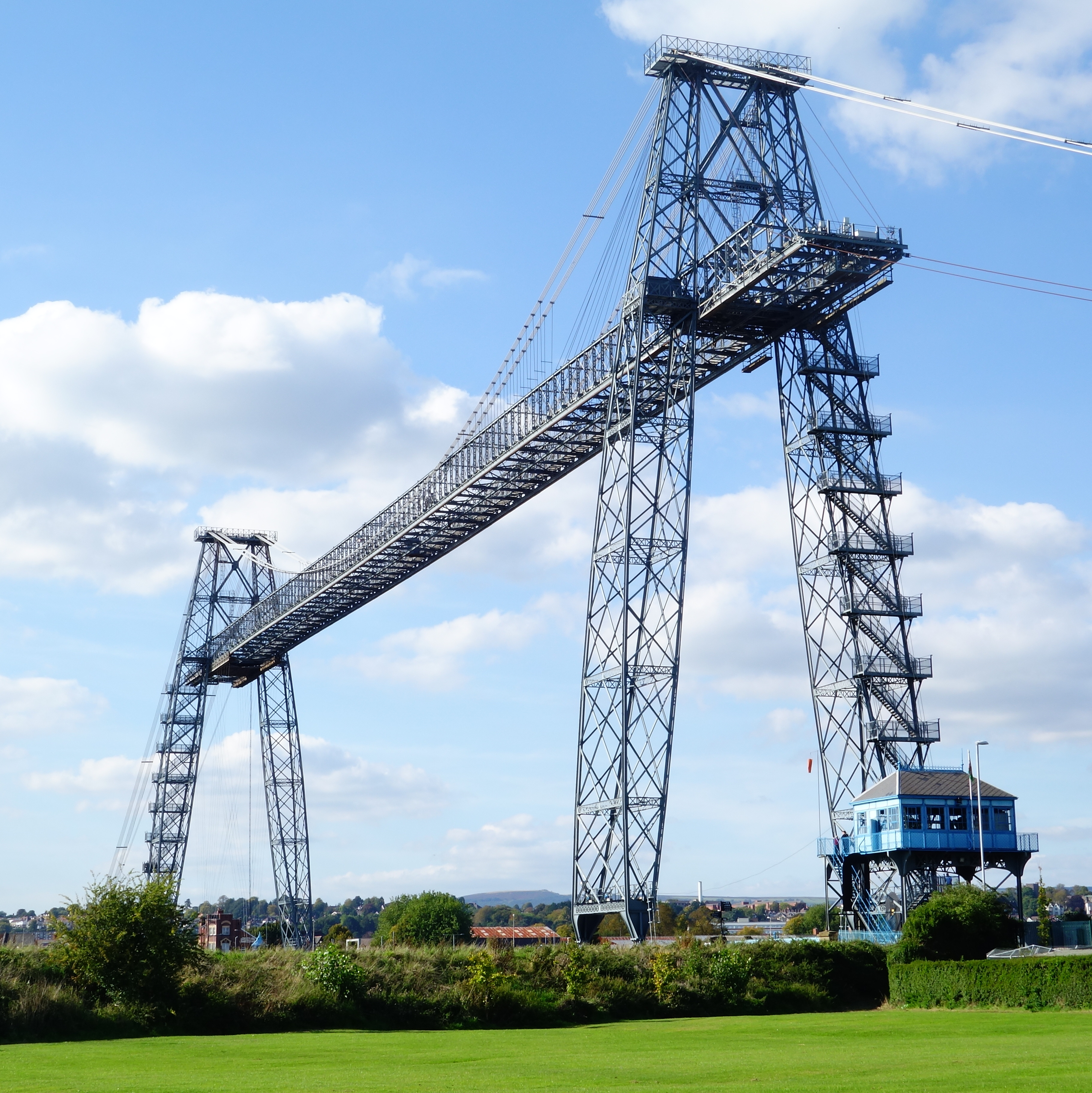
The Newport Transporter Bridge, opened in 1906

Newport has nine public bridges spanning the River Usk, connecting the east and west of the city.

From north to south they are: Caerleon Bridge, St. Julian's railway bridge, M4 motorway Usk bridge, Usk Railway Bridge, Newport Bridge, Newport City footbridge, George Street Bridge, City Bridge and Transporter Bridge.

In addition, the Twenty Ten Bridge at the Celtic Manor Resort is a footbridge crossing the River Usk north of Caerleon Bridge, not open to the public.

The city has had a long history of constructed crossings of the River Usk, wooden bridges going back to Norman times, and stone ones beginning in 1800:

- 1800: First stone structure, Newport Bridge, constructed
- 1806: Caerleon Bridge built
- 1850: South Wales Railway Usk Bridge built
- 1866: Newport Road Bridge widened
- 1866: St. Julian's railway bridge built
- 1888: second Usk Railway Bridge built beside first
- 1906: Transporter Bridge built
- 1911: Great Western Railway Usk bridge widened
- 1927: Current Newport Bridge built
- 1964: George Street Bridge built
- 1967: M4 motorway Usk bridge built
- 1989: M4 motorway Usk bridge, and additional crossings, built
- 2004: City Bridge built
- 2006: Newport City footbridge built
- 2010: Twenty Ten Bridge built

== Shopping ==
See also Category:Shopping in Newport, Wales

=== City centre ===
The main shopping streets of Newport city centre are pedestrianised with High Street and Commercial Street forming the north /south axis plus adjoining roads including Newport Arcade, Market Arcade, Skinner Street, Bridge Street, Upper Dock Street, Market Street, Griffin Street, Corn Street, Cambrian Road, Hill Street and Llanarth Street.

The five roads of Commercial Street, Stow Hill, Bridge Street, High Street and Skinner Street converge at Westgate Square (named after the Westgate Hotel) and this is generally regarded as the central point the city.

Kingsway Shopping Centre is an indoor shopping mall. The adjoining £90 million Friars Walk shopping centre opened in November 2015 is regarded as having benefited the city centre; this has 30 shops, about 12 restaurants and an 8-screen cinema. Newport Market is a Victorian indoor market on two floors with outlets for produce and general products.

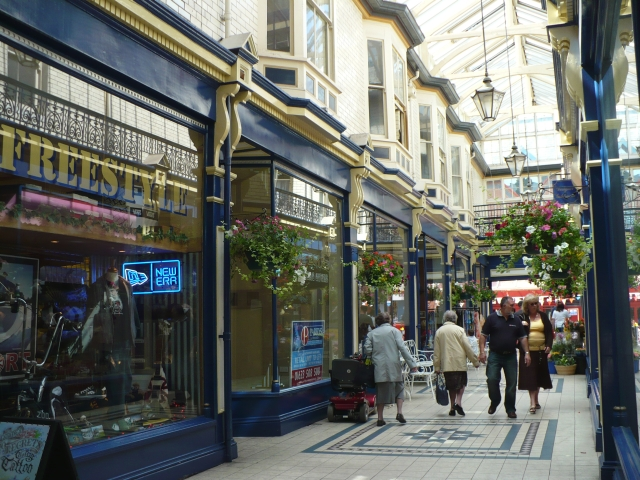
Newport Arcade, High Street

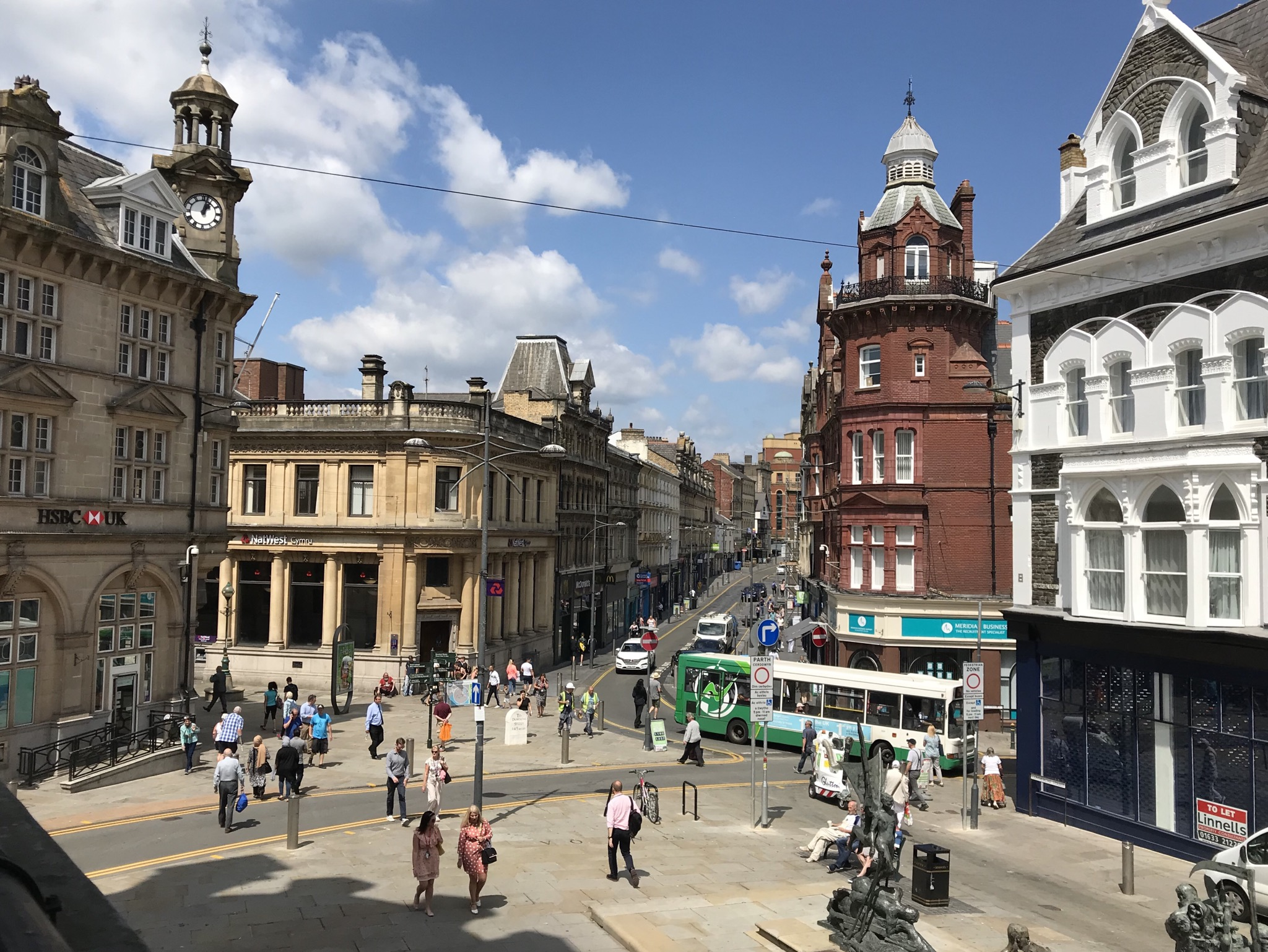
The junction of High Street, Commercial Street, Skinner Street, Bridge Street and Stow Hill in the city centre

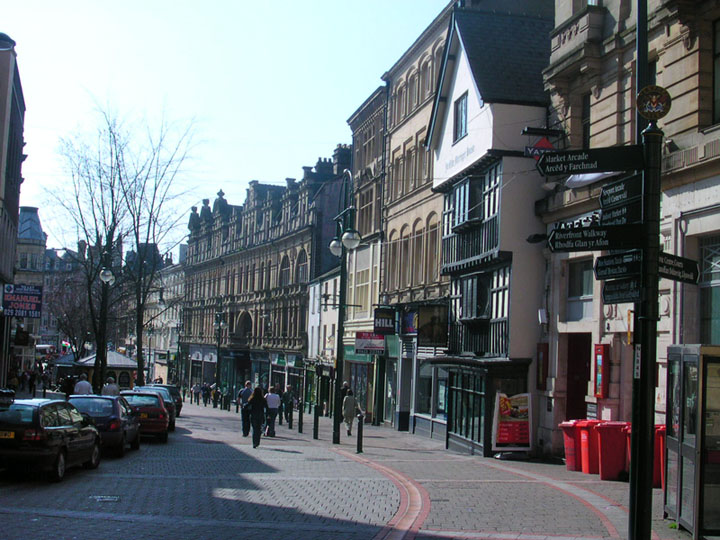
High Street

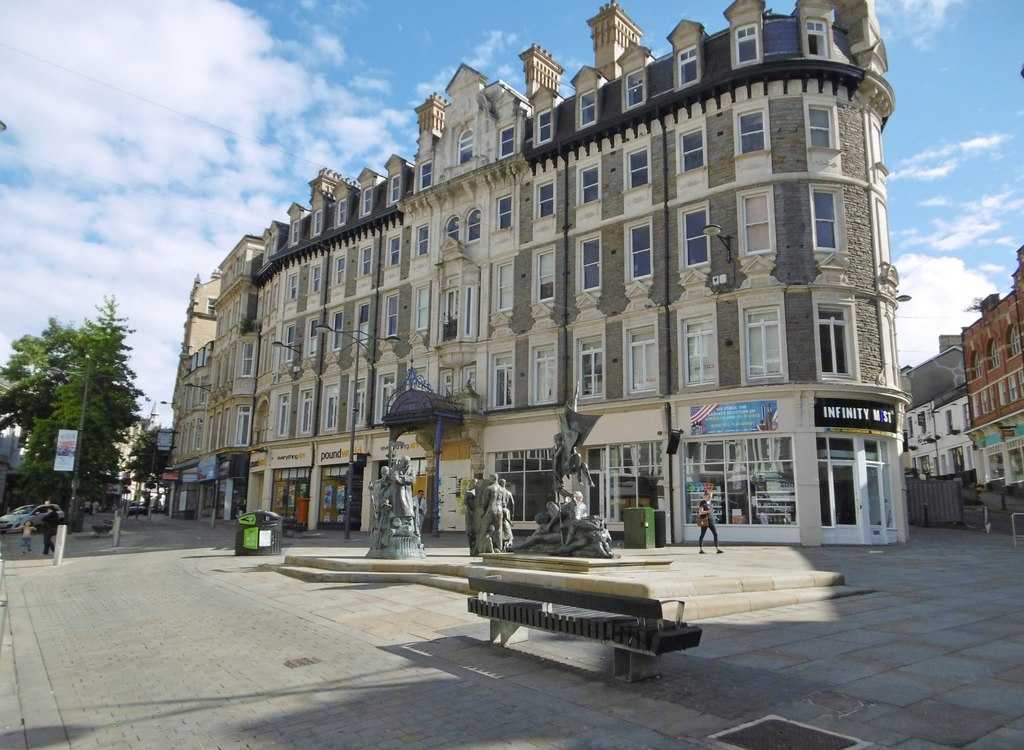
The Westgate Hotel in Commercial Street

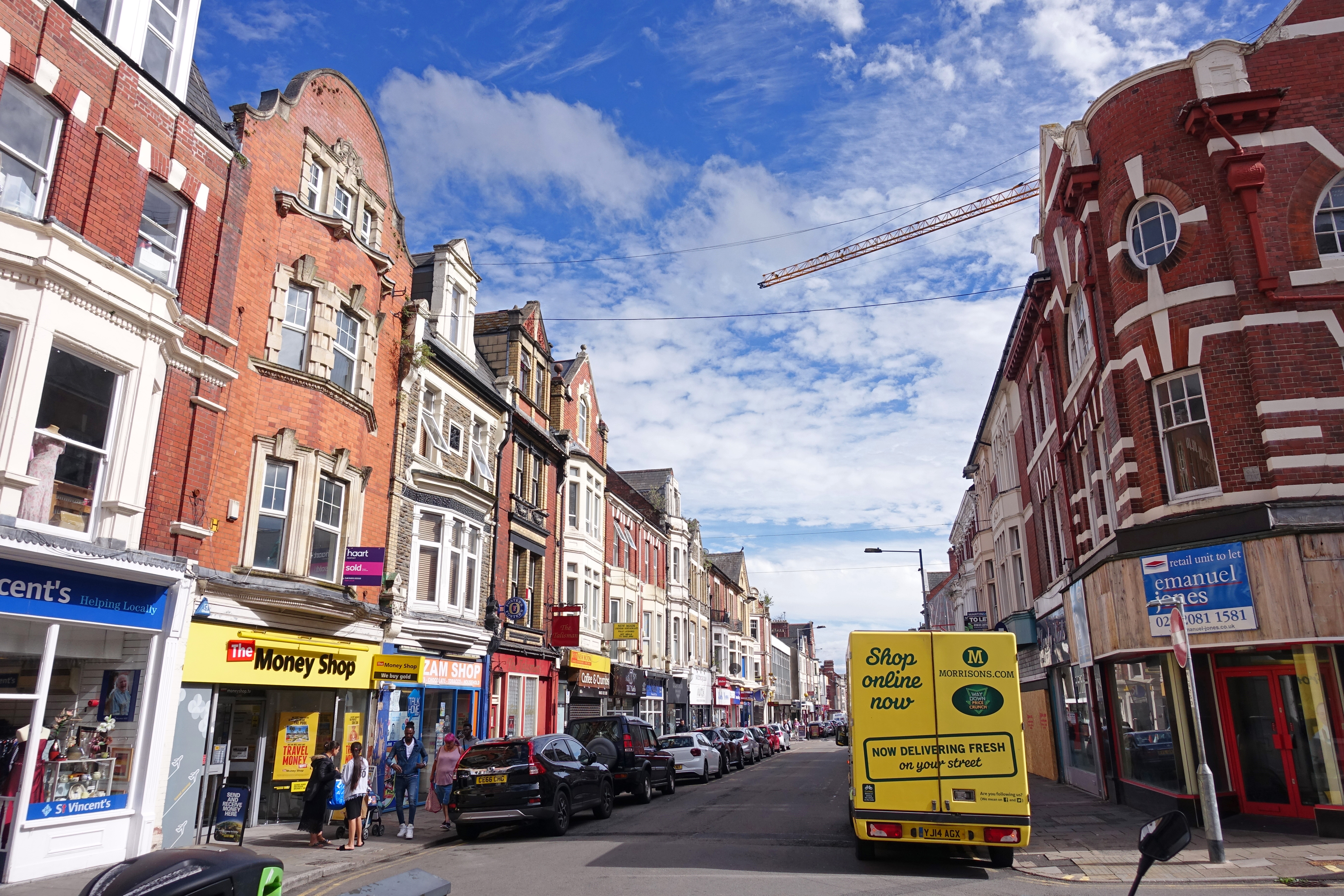
Commercial Street

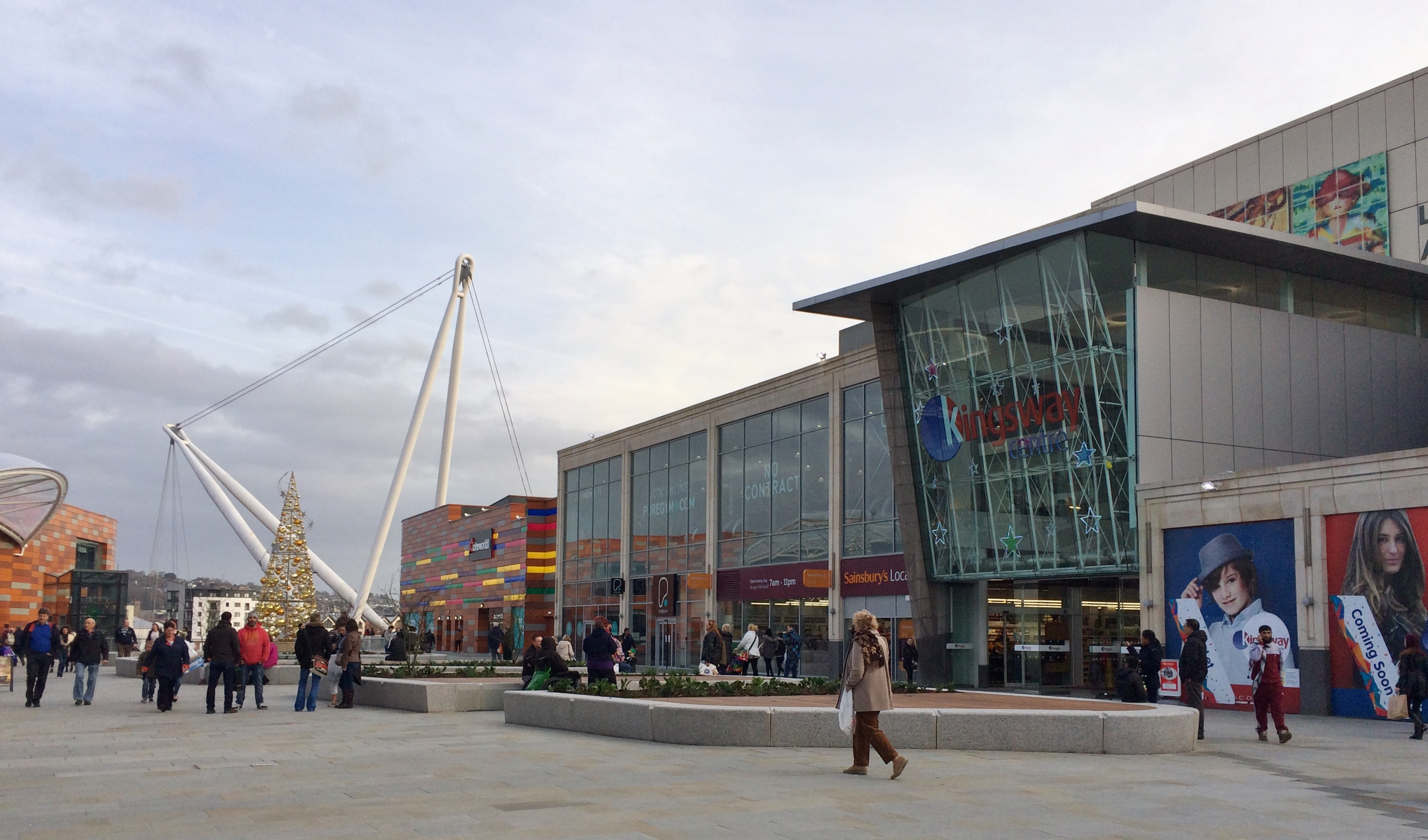
Kingsway Shopping Centre

=== Retail parks ===
Outside of the city centre large retail parks are established off the Southern Distributor Road:

- Newport Retail Park is to the east at Lliswerry – M4 motorway Junction 24 (Coldra), then A48 (Ringland Way/Spytty Road).
- Three retail parks (Harlech, Maesglas and 28 East) around Maesglas to the west of the city – M4 motorway Junction 28 (Tredegar Park), then A48.

== Education ==
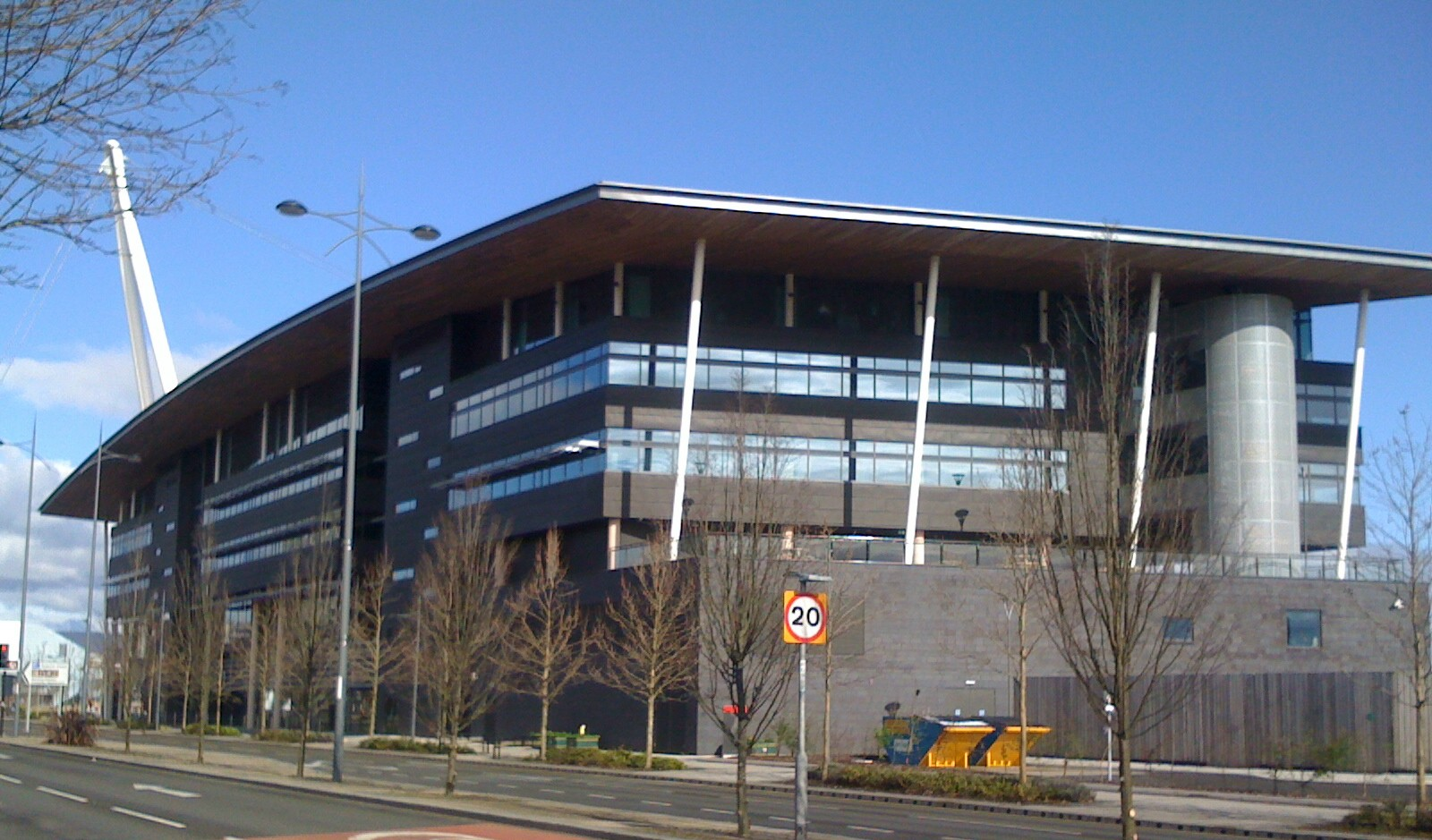
University of South Wales Newport City centre campus

The University of South Wales campus is on the west bank of the river Usk in Newport city centre. The university can trace its roots to the founding of the Newport Mechanics Institute in 1841. Newport School of Art, Media and Design was one of the first Art Schools to be awarded degree status in 1973 and enjoyed a high reputation in painting, Fine Art, and sculpture throughout the 1960s and 1970s. It is still highly regarded however, especially in documentary photography. The Fine Art course closed in 2013, its final degree show entitled 'depARTure'.

Newport also has the further-education Coleg Gwent City of Newport Campus, informally known as Nash College, in Lliswerry. Brynglas House is currently an Adult Education Centre.

Newport has eight English-medium state secondary comprehensive schools: Bassaleg School, Newport High School, St Joseph's Roman Catholic High School, Caerleon Comprehensive School, John Frost School, Lliswerry High School, Llanwern High School and St Julians High School. The Welsh-medium secondary school is Ysgol Gyfun Gwent Is Coed in Duffryn.

Newport has four Welsh-medium primary schools; Ysgol Gymraeg Casnewydd in Ringland, Ysgol Gymraeg Bro Teyrnon in Brynglas and Ysgol Gymraeg Ifor Hael in Bettws. Ysgol Gymraeg Nant Gwenlli is temporarily located in Caerleon and is planned to move to the refurbished former Pillgwenlly Primary school site in 2025. Pillgwenlly Primary moved to a new build facility in 2024 on the former Corus steel Whiteheads site.

All the above schools are state funded schools governed by Newport Local Education Authority. Rougemont School in Malpas is an independent fee-paying school, taking pupils from age 3 to 18.

A football academy is based at Llanwern High School. It was established in 1998 as a partnership of Newport County Football Club and Newport City Council, when the school was named Hartridge High School. The academy has a development programme of around 50 students undertaking sporting qualifications. The students compete in the EFL Youth Alliance as Newport County's youth team.

== Culture and arts ==
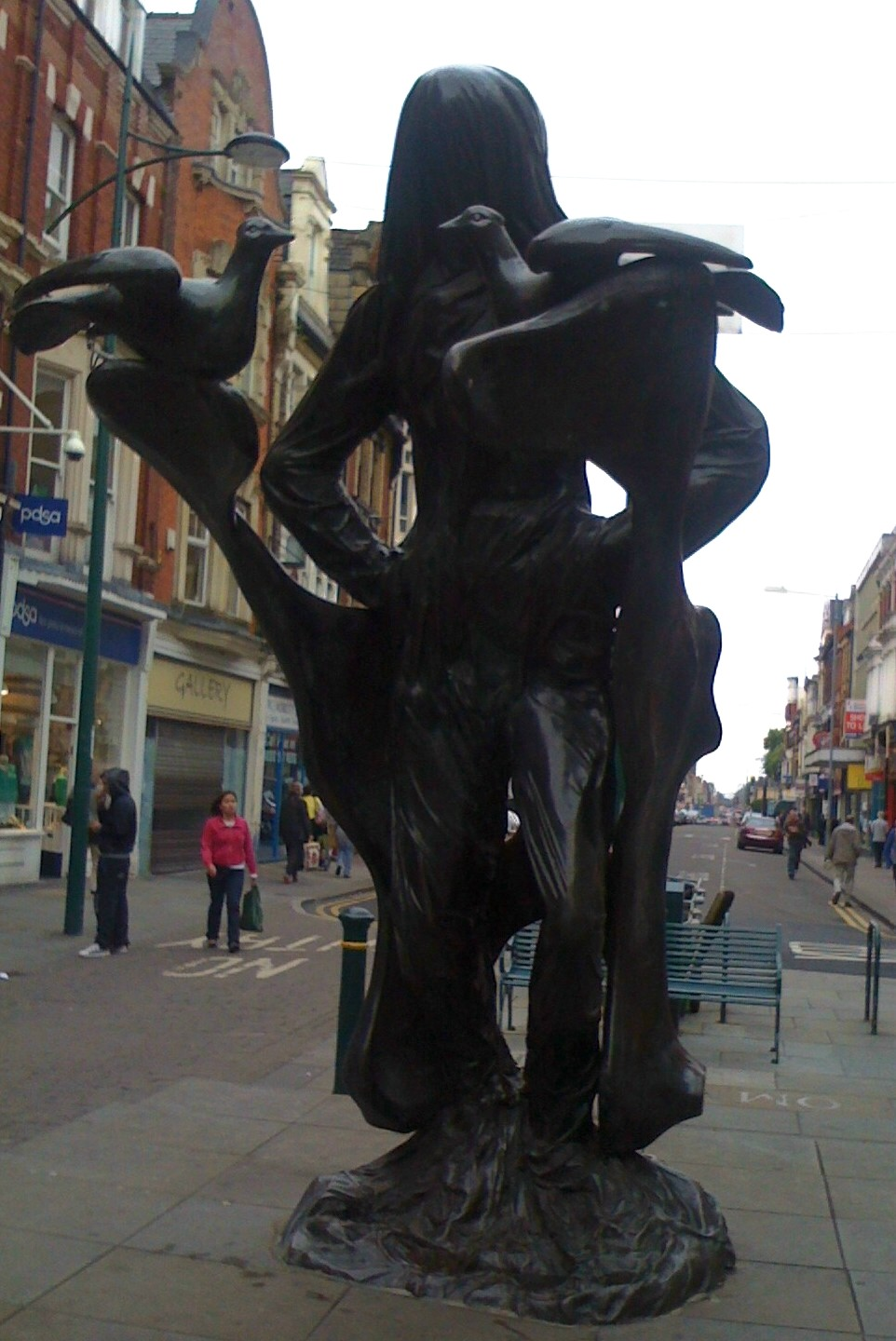
'Stand and Stare' statue commemorating the work of Newport poet W. H. Davies in Commercial Street

See also Category:Culture in Newport, Wales

Newport Transporter Bridge is one of the few remaining working bridges of its type in the world and featured in the film Tiger Bay. Visitors can travel on the suspended cradle most days and can walk atop the steel framework on bank holidays. The only other British example is Middlesbrough Transporter Bridge. Open days are occasionally held to view the renovation of the historically important Newport Ship.

The Riverfront Arts Centre is a modern purpose-built theatre and arts venue. The Dolman Theatre was refurbished in 2005. The Phyllis Maud Performance Space theatre seats between 25 and 30 in a converted Victorian public toilet.

The city has many works of civic art including:

- The 40 ft-high (12 m) steel Wave by Peter Fink (1991), on the west bank of the River Usk.
- Twelve painted murals by Hans Feibusch (1961–64) at the Newport Civic Centre.
- Tiled murals by Kenneth Budd (1975) at the Old Green Interchange.
- Union, Prudence, Energy statues commemorating the Chartist Newport Rising outside the Westgate Hotel. Created by Christopher Kelly (1991).
- Stand and Stare statue by Paul Bothwell Kincaid, in Commercial Street, commemorating the work of poet W. H. Davies, who was born in Newport and lived his early life there. Davies is best known for his poem Leisure; "What is this life if, full of care, We have no time to stand and stare".
- Statue of Charles Morgan, 1st Baron Tredegar, in Bridge Street, created by John Evan Thomas (1850).
- Merchant Navy Memorial statue (1991) by Sebastien Boyesen at Gilligan's Island.
- This Little Piggy statue by Sebastien Boyesen (1994) outside Newport Market.
- The Vision of St.Gwynllyw/The Bell Carrier statue by Sebastien Boyesen (1996) in Llanarth Street.
- Archform sculpture by Harvey Hood at Newport Railway Station.
- In the Nick of Time, known locally as the Newport Clock, by sculptor Andy Plant at Glan Llyn, Llanwern. Formerly stood in John Frost Square.
- British Women's Temperance Association Drinking Fountain (1913) – terracotta fountain, at Newport Cathedral, made by Royal Doulton.
- Stone memorial to the Allied invasion of Europe on 6 June 1944 in High Street.
- Chartist Frieze commemorating the Chartist Newport Rising in Friars Walk by Sebastien Boyesen (2015).

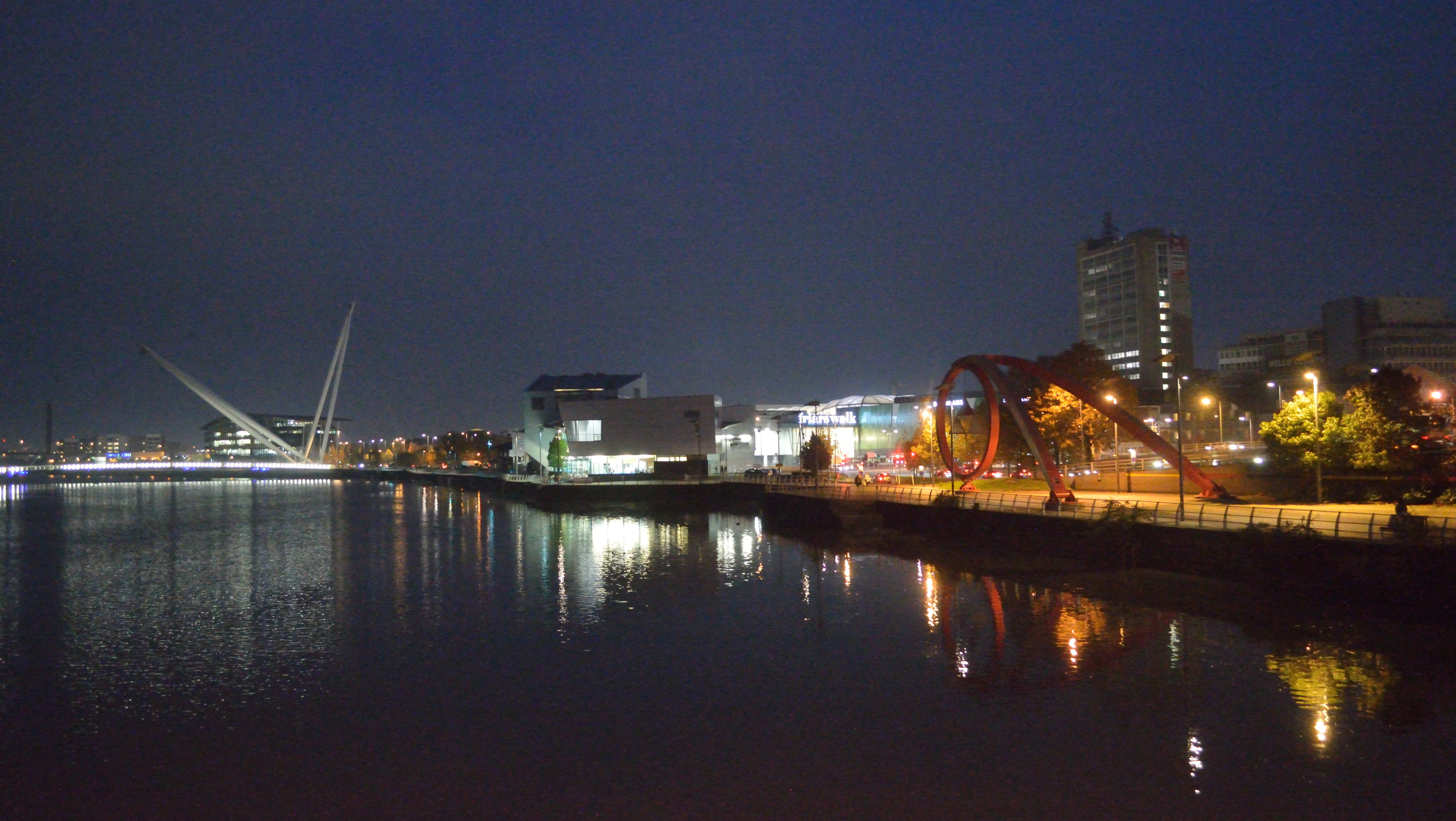
Riverside view at night around the Riverfront Arts Centre

Newport has three major museums: Newport Museum in the city centre and at Caerleon the National Roman Legion Museum and Roman Baths Museum. Newport Central Library is located within Newport Museum. In July each year an Arts festival is held in Caerleon and Roman Military re-enactment in the amphitheatre, the largest restored amphitheatre in Britain. The remains of the Roman baths, barracks and fortress walls of Isca Augusta can be seen at Caerleon. Caerleon also has literary associations to the legend of King Arthur through Geoffrey of Monmouth and later Arthur Machen (who was born in Caerleon) and Alfred Lord Tennyson wrote his Idylls of the King in Caerleon.

The Newport Festival runs throughout the summer months with a large number of events being staged in the city centre and elsewhere in the city.

Set in a park of 90 acres (36 ha), Tredegar House is an example of a 17th-century Charles II mansion. The earliest surviving part of the building dates back to the late 15th century. For over five hundred years, it was home to the Morgans – later Lords Tredegar – until they left in 1951. The house was then bought by the Catholic Church and used as a girls' school until it was bought by the council in 1974, which led to it being described as the "grandest council house in Britain".

Newport hosted the National Eisteddfod of Wales in 1897, 1988 and 2004.

A 115 ft-long (35 m) mosaic Chartist Mural was created in 1978 near John Frost Square to commemorate the Chartist rising of 1839. It was demolished amid protests in October 2013 to make way for city centre redevelopment. A trust was set up to commission a new memorial with £50,000 of funding provided by Newport City Council In 2014 the Newport Chartist Commission, with members Dame Rosemary Butler, Pat Drewett and Rowan Williams, sought to recruit a project manager.

A smaller replica of the mural, in four panels, was unveiled on 4 November 2019, exactly 180 years since the Chartist uprising. It was created by Oliver Budd, son of the original mural's creator, Kenneth Budd. The panels are located on Cefn Road, Rogerstone, and include an information board telling the history of Chartism.

As part of the city's "Big Splash" festival, on 30 August 2010, 45-year-old French circus star Olivier Roustan from Toulouse, performed the highest ever wirewalk in Europe, along the top cable of the Newport City footbridge.

Newport hosted an outdoor art exhibition called "SuperDragons" in 2010 which displayed 60 large dragons decorated by local community groups.

In November 2013 the Newport Arts, Culture and Heritage Association (NACHA), which promotes "the past, present and future of the arts, culture and heritage of the people of Newport, South Wales" was launched on Facebook. In December 2014 chairman of the Friends of Newport Museum and Art Gallery, Richard Frame, expressed alarm at Newport City Council proposals to close the museum in 2015.

=== Music and nightlife ===
See also Music of Newport

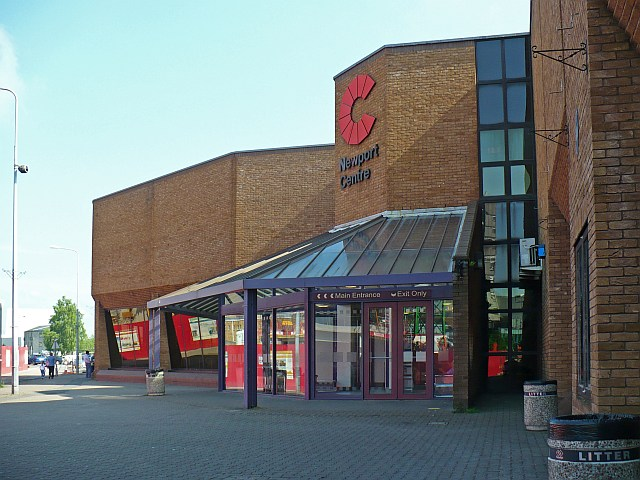
Newport Centre

The city centre has many pubs, bars and nightclubs, mostly in the vicinity of High Street. The most famous of these was TJ's, an alternative music club where it is claimed that Kurt Cobain of Nirvana proposed to Courtney Love, which closed in 2010. TJ's was voted one of the top 50 'Big Nights Out' in the world by FHM in December 1997.

The Riverfront Arts Centre is a popular concert venue. Other live music venues in the city centre include NEON, Six Feet Under, Le Pub, Riverside Tavern, Warehouse 54, McCann's, Slippin Jimmy's, El Sieco's, and The Potters. The Newport Centre, which hosted many music concerts from 1984 to the 2010s, was closed during the COVID-19 pandemic and was subsequently demolished in 2023. The planned replacement leisure centre will not have a concert and performance space.

Outdoor music events are held in the summer months at Beechwood Park, Belle Vue Park, Rodney Parade, as well as the Pillgwenlly and Maindee carnivals.

Newport is the subject of a 2010 song "Newport (Ymerodraeth State of Mind)", a parody of the Alicia Keys song "Empire State of Mind". The video went viral, was featured on BBC News, and by August 2010, nearly 2.5 million people had watched it on YouTube. YouTube removed the video due to a copyright claim by music publishers. Newport-based rap group Goldie Lookin Chain released a 'parody of a parody' video in response, alleging that their rivals lacked local knowledge.

City of Newport Male Choir is one of the leading male voice choirs in the region.

=== Parks and playing fields ===
See also Category:Parks in Newport, Wales

The main municipal parks in Newport are Tredegar Park, Belle Vue Park and Beechwood Park. The main municipal playing fields are at Tredegar Park, Coronation Park, Glebelands, Pillgwenlly sports ground, Kimberley Park, Shaftesbury Park and Caerleon Broadway.

== Walking, cycling and leisure sports ==
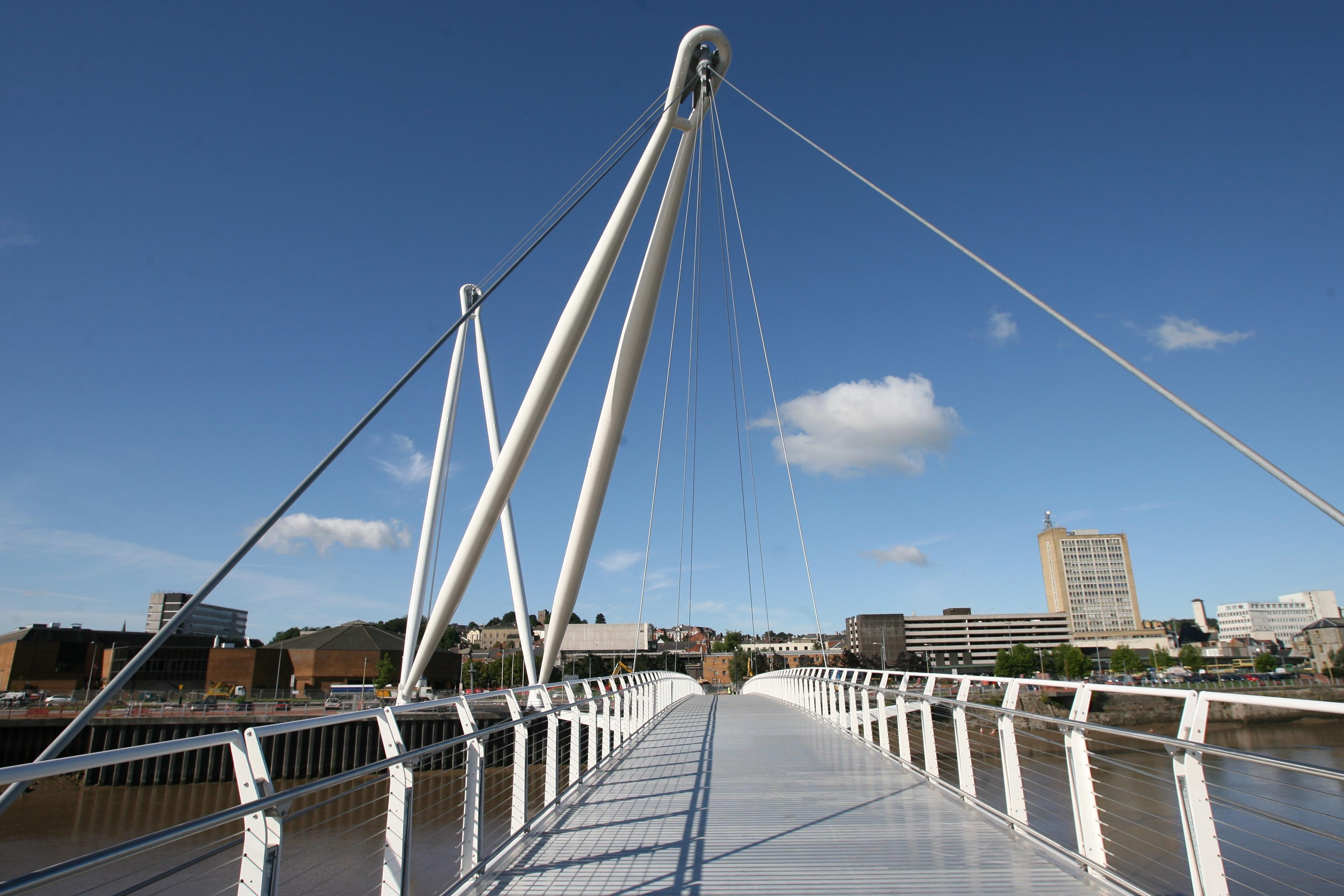
Newport City footbridge

To the south of the city lies the extensive Caldicot and Wentloog Levels and Newport Wetlands Reserve. The Wetlands reserve opened in March 2000 as a mitigation for the loss of mudflats caused by the building of the Cardiff Bay Barrage. A Local Nature Reserve is established at Allt-yr-yn.

Newport City footbridge is a cycle and pedestrian bridge in Newport city centre linking the east and west banks of the River Usk.

A cycle and pedestrian walkway on the west bank of the River Usk links Newport city centre at Crindau to central Caerleon. There is a marked heritage trail in Caerleon. A cycle and pedestrian walkway is on both banks of the River Usk. The East bank path links Newport Bridge to Lliswerry. The West bank path links Newport Bridge to Newport Transporter Bridge and to Lliswerry via Newport City Bridge. It is therefore possible to walk or cycle from the north to the south of the City whilst largely avoiding public roads.

The Celtic Trail cycle route and National Cycle Route 4 passes through Newport.

The main municipal leisure sports facilities are based at Newport Centre in the city centre, Newport International Sports Village at Lliswerry and the Newport Active Living Centre at Bettws. There is a purpose-built indoor bowls arena at the Glebelands.

The city has a thriving Scout District.

== Sport ==
See also Category:Sport in Newport, Wales

=== Boxing ===
The boxer David Pearce was born in Newport.

=== Rugby ===
Newport RFC was established in 1874 and was one of the founder members of the Welsh Rugby Union in 1881. Newport was the only side to beat the (otherwise) Invincible All Blacks of 1963–64 and has also beaten the other two major Southern Hemisphere sides, Australia and South Africa, in its history.

Since the introduction of regional rugby franchises in Wales in 2003, Newport RFC now play in the Welsh Premier Division and operate as a feeder club to the Dragons regional team, who play in the United Rugby Championship. While the Dragons play at Rodney Parade near Newport city centre, Newport RFC play the majority of their home games at Newport Stadium in the Spytty area of the city.

Nine other rugby union teams playing in the Welsh League are based in Newport; Newport Saracens, Pill Harriers, Newport High School Old Boys, Bettws, Caerleon, Hartridge, Rogerstone, St Julians High School Old Boys and Whiteheads.

Newport had a rugby league club called the Newport Titans which played in the Welsh Conference Premier until it folded in 2012.

=== Football ===
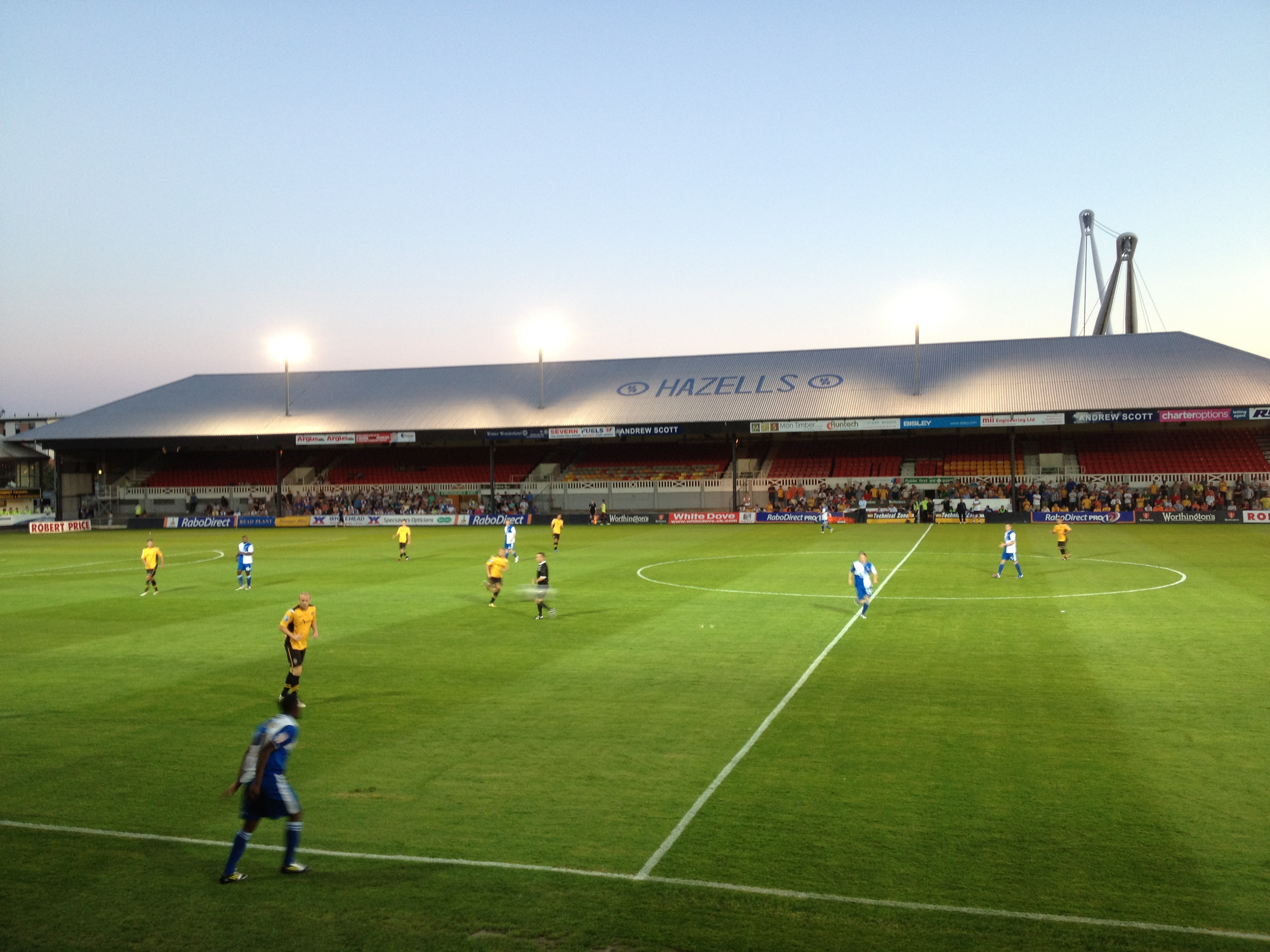
Rodney Parade, home of Newport County, Dragons, and Newport RFC

Newport's best known association football club is Newport County, who were formed in 1912 and joined the English Football League in 1920. Newport County have played in the second tier of English football and spent over 60 seasons in the Football League, reached the last 16 of the FA Cup, won the Welsh Cup in 1980 and subsequently reached the quarter-finals of the European Cup Winners' Cup in 1981. They were relegated from the Football League in 1988 and went bankrupt the following year. The club re-formed in 1989. They secured promotion back to the Football League for the 2013–14 season after a 25-year absence and now play in Football League Two.

Newport is also home to Cymru South (Welsh pyramid tier 2) side Newport City and Ardal South East league (tier 3) Lliswerry. A number of teams play in the Gwent County League tier 4: Caerleon, Newport Civil Service, Newport Corinthians, Pill and Rogerstone. Tier 5: Albion Rovers, Graig and Newport Saints. Tier 6: Riverside Rovers. The city has its own league, the Newport and District Football League, which is part of the Welsh football league system and consequently some Newport clubs field teams in the Gwent County League. Lovell's Athletic were a fairly well known team in the mid-20th century – due to the suspension of League football during the Second World War they were the premier team in the city, as Newport County did not field a side. During this period they managed to reach the 3rd round of the FA Cup in the 1945–46 season.

Dragon Park (Welsh: Parc y Ddraig), the Football Association of Wales' National Football Centre, is located at the Newport International Sports Village. The centre also provides the headquarters for the Welsh Football Trust.

=== Golf ===
The city is home to the Celtic Manor Resort, a five-star conference resort and home of the Wales Open, the annual European Tour golf tournament. The resort was the venue for the All*Star Cup celebrity golf tournament in 2005 and for the 2010 Ryder Cup.

The city has golf facilities at Llanwern Golf Club, Peterstone Golf Club, Parc Golf Academy in Coedkernew and Newport Golf Club and Tredegar Park Golf Club in Rogerstone. Caerleon has a municipal course, driving range and clubhouse.

Within a short drive of Newport are golf clubs at St Mellons, Dewstow, Shirenewton, St Pierre, GreenMeadow, Woodlake, Alice Springs, Pontypool and Raglan.

=== Cycling ===
The Newport International Sports Village at Lliswerry includes the Wales National Velodrome, the head office of Welsh Cycling.

=== Tennis ===
Newport was a key venue for British Tennis. The 'World Group' Ties for the 1906 International Lawn Tennis Challenge (forerunner to the Davis Cup) were hosted at Newport Athletic Club.

=== Other sports ===
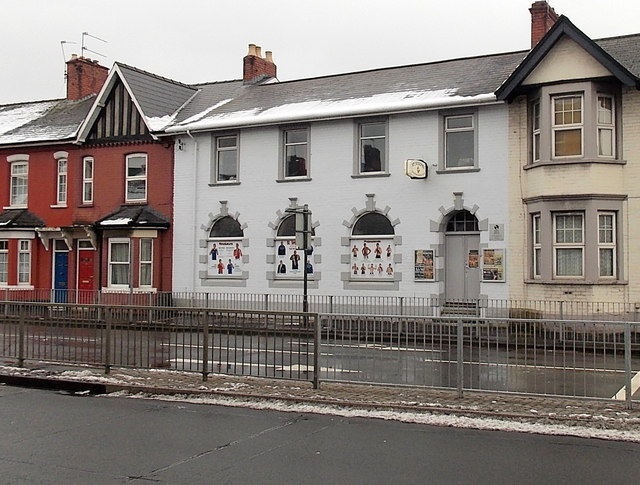
St Josephs Amateur Boxing Club, George Street

The Newport International Sports Village has been home to Newport Cricket Club since moving from Rodney Parade in 1990.

For many years the city had a motorcycle speedway team Newport Wasps but the team was disbanded in 2012.

Newport is one of three main cities where British baseball is still played – the others are Cardiff and Liverpool – and the city hosts an international match every four years at Coronation Park.

South East Wales Regional Swimming Pool is located at Newport International Sports Village. Newport Tennis Centre is also located at the complex and is a municipal multi-sport facility for tennis (indoor and outdoor), five-a-side football, basketball, field hockey, netball, table tennis, badminton, and squash.

Newport Squash Club has four courts situated in the grounds of Rodney Parade and the club operates a public pay-per-play arrangement there.

St. Joseph's Amateur Boxing Club is situated on George Street and is the home club of Yemeni-born 2006 Commonwealth bronze medallist Mo Nasir and 2010 Commonwealth Silver medallist Sean McGoldrick.

Treetops Shooting Ground, Coedkernew is one of Britain's best-equipped clay pigeon shooting grounds and often hosts competitions between local shooting clubs and university clay shooting clubs from around South Wales and South West England.

Newport hosted the International Cross Country Championships (1903–1972) on six occasions (1906, 1911, 1921, 1927, 1933 and 1955) at Caerleon Racecourse.

Newport has a Skittle Alley League consisting of over 50 teams who play their league games on a Friday evening.

Horse racing was held at Newport Racecourse, Caerleon, from the 1840s until it closed in 1948. In its final year of racing the course staged the Welsh Grand National for the only time.

=== Annual sporting events ===
The city is currently home to a number of annual sporting events, including:

- The Wales Open European Tour golf tournament
- The Elemis Invitational Trophy tennis tournament
- The Welsh Open world ranking snooker tournament
- The World Cup of Pool
- The Newport Half Marathon

== Local media ==
Newport's local newspaper is the South Wales Argus, which is published in the city and distributed throughout the city and surrounding area.

There is also a daily Newport edition of the Western Mail that serves the city, along with its digital publication NewportOnline – the city's most-read online news platform.

Local television news programmes are BBC Wales Today and ITV Wales at Six.

Local analogue radio broadcasting licences cover the Cardiff/Newport area; the FM licence is held by Communicorp, broadcasting as Capital South Wales from Cardiff Bay and the AM licence is held by Global, broadcasting as Smooth Wales, however the AM frequencies, 1305 and 1359, were switched off on 12 October 2020 but Smooth continues to be broadcast on DAB. The local DAB ensemble is South Wales and Severn Estuary (12C). Heart South Wales, also from Cardiff Bay, is also available in the Newport area.

Newport has several internet radio stations, the most popular of which is Newport City Radio.

== Twinning ==
Newport is twinned with:

- Heidenheim, Germany (since 1980)
- Kutaisi, Georgia (since 1989)

=== Former relations ===
- Guangxi Province, China, from 1996 to 2019 (defunct)

Newport City Council voted unanimously on 23 July 2019 to effectively end relations with the Guangxi Province region of China.

38,000 people had petitioned the council to end its twinning agreement due to the Yulin Dog Meat Festival, which takes place in the Guangxi town of Yulin each year. Council Leader Debbie Wilcox, Baroness Wilcox stated that while the council had previously written a strong letter to officials from Guangxi, this had been ignored, and that cutting ties was now necessary. The Council says it will now lobby the Foreign and Commonwealth Office and the Great Britain–China Centre on the issue of protecting dogs.

== Freedom of the City ==
The following people, military units and Groups have received the Freedom of the City of Newport.

=== Individuals ===
- Godfrey Morgan, 1st Viscount Tredegar: 1909. (Borough of Newport)
- John Moses: 1909. (Borough of Newport)
- Albert Augustus Newman: 1922. (Borough of Newport)
- James Henry Thomas: 1924. (Borough of Newport)
- John Parry: 1927. (Borough of Newport)
- Horace Sampson Lyne: 1934. (Borough of Newport)
- John Moxon: 1935. (Borough of Newport)
- William Royse Lysaght: 1936. (Borough of Newport)
- Frederick Phillips: 1936. (Borough of Newport)
- John Lloyd Davies: 1936. (Borough of Newport)
- Field Marshal Lord Montgomery of Alamein: 1945. (Borough of Newport)
- Mary Ann Hart: 1954. (Borough of Newport)
- Alderman Aubrey Hames: 19 February 1998. (Borough of Newport)
- Sir Harry Jones: 8 April 2004. (City of Newport)

=== Military units ===
- The South Wales Borderers: 1947. (Borough of Newport)
- The Royal Regiment of Wales: 1969. (Borough of Newport)
- 104th Regiment Royal Artillery (Volunteers): 1978. (Borough of Newport)
- The Royal Welch Fusiliers: 2001. (Borough of Newport)
- The Merchant Navy Association (Red Duster): 2002. (City of Newport)
- HMS Severn, RN: 2006. (City of Newport)

=== Organisations and groups ===
- Newport County Association Football Club: 2013. (City of Newport)
- Newport Rugby Football Club: 2013. (City of Newport)
- The Royal British Legion: 29 June 2021. (City of Newport)

== See also ==
- Newport Castle
- Newport power station
