= List of places in Newport =

Map of places in Newport compiled from this list
See the list of places in Wales for places in other principal areas.

This is a categorised list of places in the City of Newport, South Wales.

== Electoral Wards ==
See List of electoral wards in Newport, Wales

This is a list of electoral wards:

- Allt-yr-yn
- Alway
- Beechwood
- Bettws
- Bishton and Langstone
- Caerleon
- Gaer
- Graig
- Llanwern
- Lliswerry
- Malpas
- Pillgwenlly
- Ringland
- Rogerstone East
- Rogerstone North
- Rogerstone West
- Shaftesbury
- St Julians
- Stow Hill
- Tredegar Park and Marshfield
- Victoria

== Notable places ==
=== Archaeological sites ===
- Caerleon
- Caldicot and Wentloog Levels including -
  - Goldcliff
  - Uskmouth

=== Conservation areas ===
- Uskmouth

=== Historical buildings ===
- Tredegar House
- Newport Civic Centre
- Newport Castle
- Newport Cathedral
- Westgate Hotel

=== Municipal parks ===
- Tredegar Park
- Beechwood Park
- Belle Vue Park

=== Shopping centres ===
- Kingsway Shopping Centre
- Cambrian Centre (City Spires)
- Friars Walk
- Newport Retail Park

== Cultural venues ==
=== Sport ===
- Celtic Manor Resort
- Kingsway Arena
- Newport Stadium (capacity: 4,300)
- Rodney Parade (capacity: 11,700)
- Hayley Stadium (speedway)
- Newport International Sports Village

=== Performing arts ===
Performing arts venues with seating capacity:

- Dolman Theatre (400)
- Newport Centre (2,000)
- The NEON (1,546)
- Riverfront Arts Centre (500 in main theatre)

Typically standing venues:

- T.J.'s

== Geographical ==
=== Rivers and waterways ===
- Fourteen Locks
- Monmouthshire Canal
- River Usk
- Ebbw River
- Afon Llwyd

=== Streets and squares ===
- John Frost Square

== Education places ==
- University of Wales, Newport
- Coleg Gwent City of Newport campus

== Transport ==
=== Bus and railway stations ===
- Newport bus station
- Newport railway station
- Rogerstone railway station

=== Major roads ===
- A48 road
- A449 road
- A4042 road
- M4 motorway
- A48(M) motorway
- New M4 (not yet built)
- Commercial Street
- High Street

=== Railway lines ===
- Ebbw Valley Railway
- Gloucester to Newport Line
- South Wales Main Line (Great Western Main Line)
- Welsh Marches Line

=== Cycling ===
- National Cycle Network: routes 4, 46 and 47

=== Shipping ===
- Newport Docks

=== Bridges and crossings ===
River Usk, north to south:

- Caerleon Bridge
- St. Julian's railway bridge
- M4 motorway Usk bridge
- Usk Railway Bridge
- Newport Bridge
- Newport City footbridge
- George Street Bridge
- City Bridge
- Newport Transporter Bridge
