= Chartist Tower =

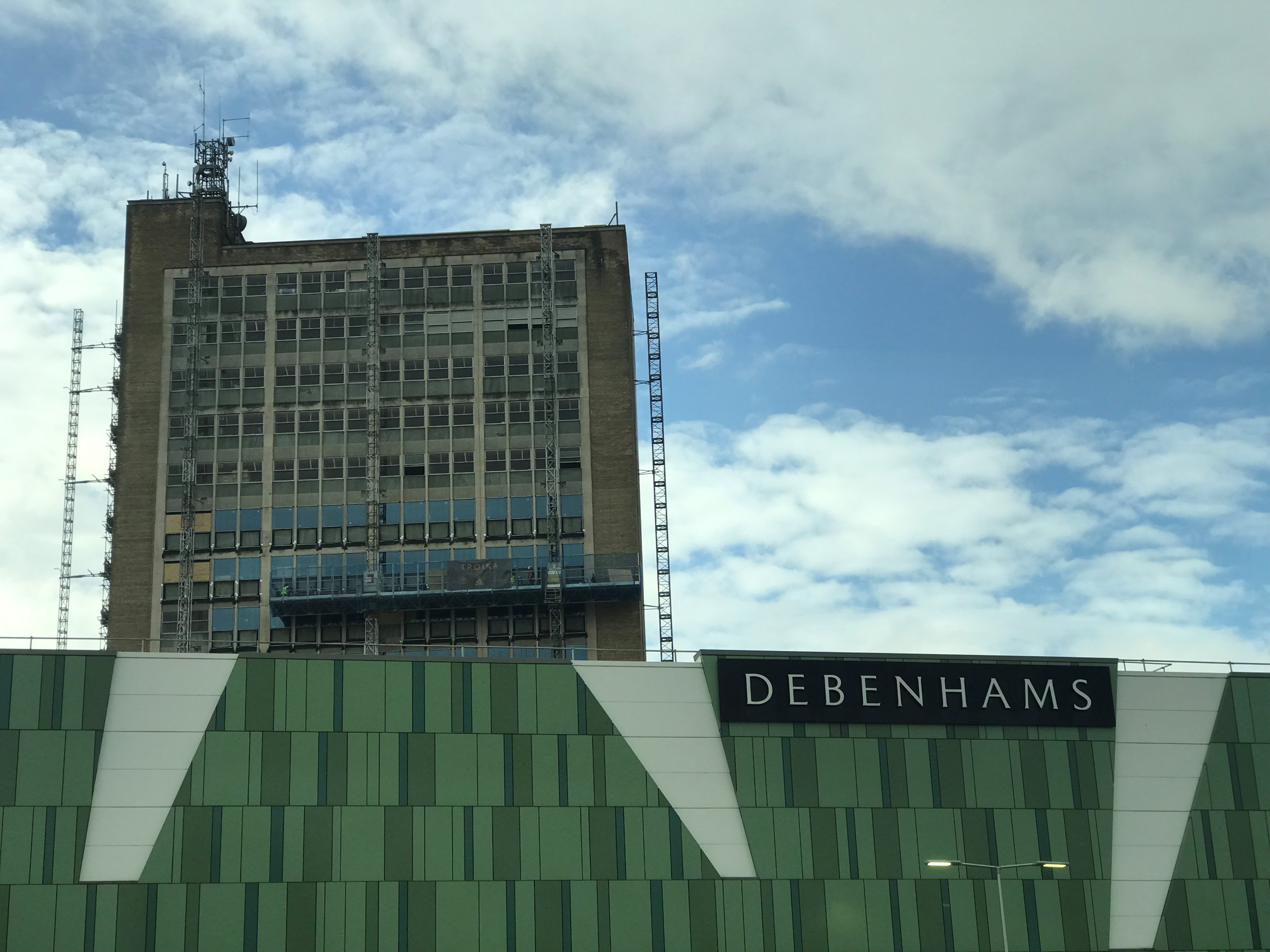
- Chartist Tower from behind Friar's Walk

- Location within Wales

General information
- Status: Completed (under renovation)
- Type: High-rise building
- Location: Newport, Wales
- Coordinates: 51.5872845°N 2.9950542°W
- Completed: 1966
- Renovated: 2019
- Owner: Garrison Barclay Estates

Height
- Height: 53.30 metres (175 ft)

Technical details
- Floor count: 16

Design and construction
- Architect: Powell Dobson Architects (redevelopment)

Chartist Tower is a 53.3 metre (175 ft) tall high rise building in west Newport, Wales. It was built in 1966, and is the tallest building in the city. It is now home to Mercure Newport Hotel by Accor.

== Background ==
A 250-year long lease was acquired in 2017 by Cardiff-based developers Garrison Barclay Estates (GBE) for £6.5m, and the building is now undergoing a £12m redevelopment. It has received investment from the Welsh Government of loans up to £2 million.

The building is located on Upper Dock Street. The building is accessible from both sides, at its front via the newly built Friars Walk shopping centre as well as at the rear via the historic retail hub in the city, Commercial Street.

The building is expected to re-open following refurbishment by Summer 2019.

== Etymology ==
The building is a tribute to the participants of the 1839 Newport Rising, a key moment in the Chartist political movement. The Newport uprising was a key turning point in the campaign for universal suffrage.

Developers GBE have indicated the building will continue to pay tribute to the 1839 events, with features in the redevelopment referencing the movement and its significance to the city.

== Redevelopment ==
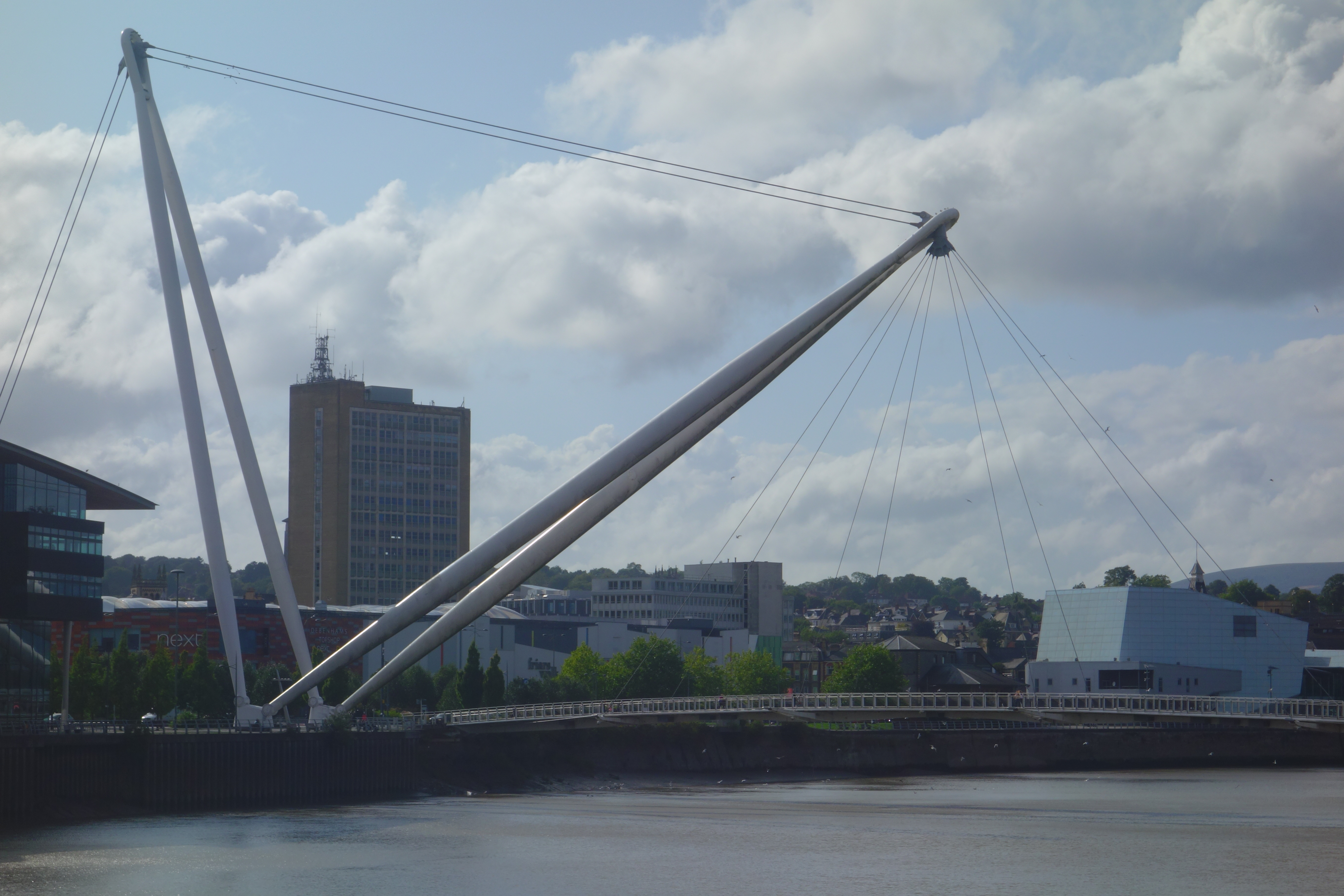
Chartist Tower visible behind the Newport City Footbridge, foreground

In September 2018, developers GBE submitted their application for change of use of the Tower to "part hotel, ancillary facilities (gym, conference space, storage space, offices & restaurant) and ground floor coffee shop".

The application further includes "office floor space [...] a restaurant [...] and external alterations to the facade of Chartist Tower [...] and to the retail units fronting Upper Dock Street, Austin Friars (former Units 1-7 & 12-13) and Commercial Street (the former BHS)".

Planning permission was approved on 7 February 2019.

Media reports have suggested the upper floor space will be let to the Mercure hotel chain, with other 3-4 chain names in discussions, including the Celtic Manor. The site has space for between 120 and 160 bedrooms on site, depending on the developer. There is approximately 30,000 sq. ft of office space and 18,000 sq. ft of ground floor retail space.

Powell Dobson Architects have been appointed to act on the redevelopment, with Bristol based Hydrock providing design consultancy. Cardiff's architectural and interior design practice The IAD Company were appointed as interior designers for the project.

In April 2019 it was announced that the Welsh Government had awarded the project up to £2 million in Visit Wales and Targeted Regeneration Investment programme loans, with the Deputy Ministers for both Housing and Local Government; as well as Culture, Tourism and Sport, affirming their commitment to the project.

== See also ==
- Newport city centre
