= Newport Unlimited =

- Formation: 2002
- Dissolved: 2014
- Type: Public/private partnership
- Legal status: Corporation
- Purpose: Urban regeneration
- Headquarters: 1 Gold Tops, Newport, NP20 4PG
- Region served: City of Newport
- Chief Executive: Gillian Otlet

Newport Unlimited was a Welsh Urban Regeneration Company created in 2003 to help counter the impacts of decline in Newport's heavy industry and manufacturing. It was initially given a 10-year lifespan.

The Company was founded by Newport City Council and the Welsh Government.

It was credited with attracting £230 million of private investment to the area; transformation of the city's river frontage, and bringing the Ryder Cup to Newport in 2010.

The Company's role was extended by a further year in 2012.

In January 2013 a leaked report revealed the Company's funding would cease in April 2013 because the Council believed it would be cheaper to carry out the role itself. In October 2013 Newport Council made a bid for funds from the Welsh Government to enable the council to continue the regeneration process.

== See also ==
- City Bridge
- Cambrian Centre
- Crindau Marina
- Friars Walk
- Kingsway Shopping Centre
- Llanwern/Llanwern steelworks
- M4 relief road
- Newport bus station
- Newport City footbridge
- Newport railway station
- Riverfront Arts Centre
- Rodney Parade
- Southern Distributor Road
- University of Wales, Newport
