= Newport Market =

Victorian market in Newport, Wales

- Marchnad Casnewydd
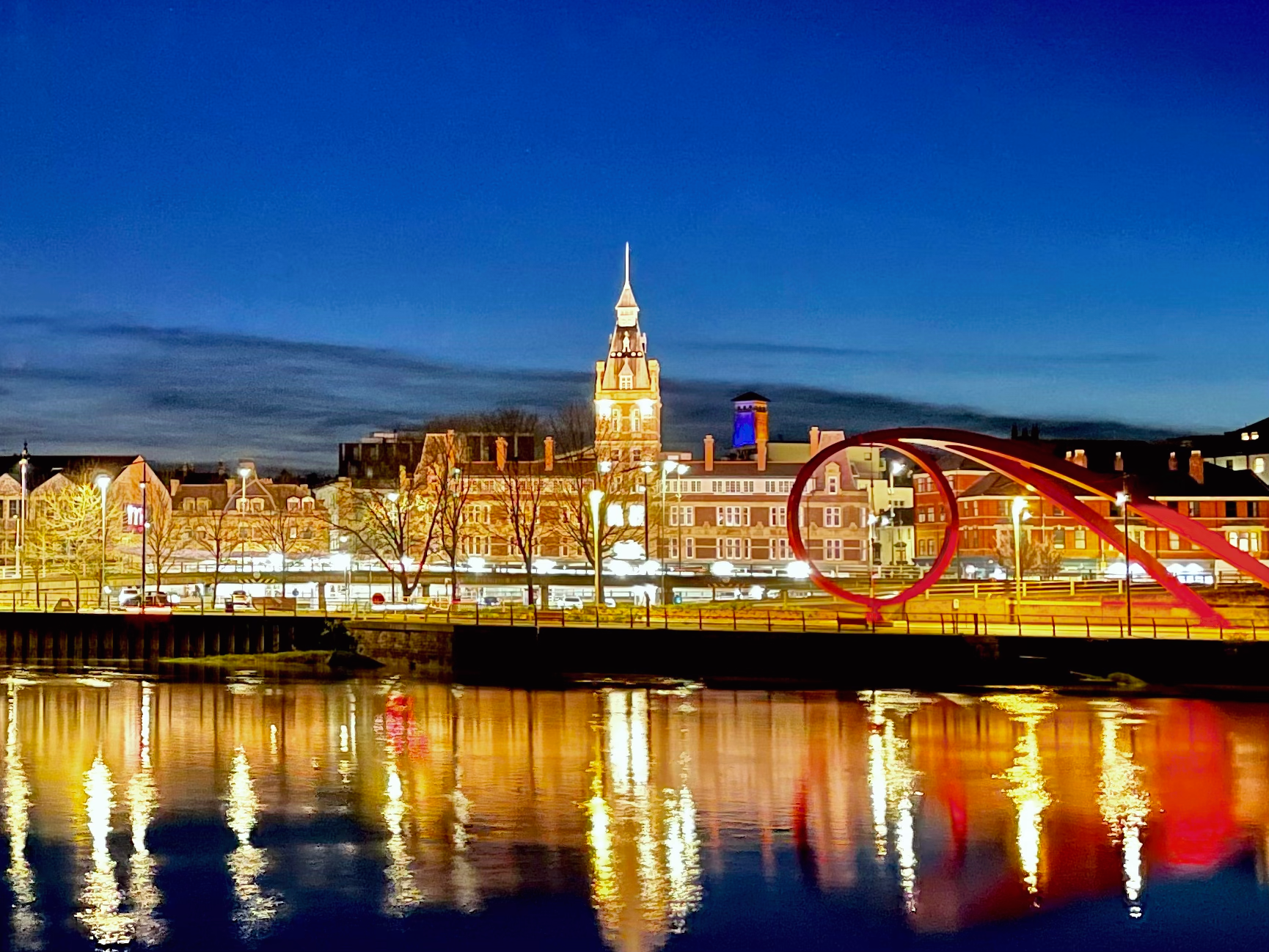
- The Market viewed from the east side of the River Usk
- Interactive map of the Newport Market area
- Alternative names: Newport Provisions Market

General information
- Status: Renovated (2022)
- Type: Marketplace
- Architectural style: Victorian
- Classification: Grade II listed building
- Location: Newport city centre, The Provision Market, NP20 1DD, Newport, Wales
- Coordinates: 51.5890°N 2.9963°W
- Grid position: ST 31075 88260
- Current tenants: Various
- Opened: 1817; 209 years ago
- Renovated: 1885; 141 years ago 2022; 4 years ago
- Renovation cost: £5-6 million
- Client: Newport City Council

Technical details
- Floor count: 2

Design and construction
- Awards: 2023 Civic Trust Award

Renovating team
- Architect: Ellis Williams Architects
- Renovating firm: Loft Co

Other information
- Public transit: Newport railway station

Website
- Newport Market site

Newport Market (also known as Newport Provisions Market) is a traditional Victorian indoor market in Newport, South Wales. It is a Grade II-Listed building in the city centre, owned and operated by Newport City Council. The main structure, completed in 1889, is an early example of a large-span cast iron-frame building featuring a glazed barrel roof. The market re-opened in March 2022 as a multi-purpose food, retail and office space following a £5–6 million renovation.

== Location ==
The market has a central position in the town, on a large site bounded by Upper Dock Street, Market Street, High Street, and Griffin Street. Newport bus station is immediately outside the Upper Dock Street entrance to Newport Market. Newport railway station is also nearby.

== History ==
A market building had occupied the High Street end of the site from around 1817, but was too small by the middle of the century, and was extended to the new Upper Dock Street in 1865. It was then demolished and rebuilt.

In 1885, the Corporation of Newport purchased the site from the Duke of Beaufort and went on to build the present structure. The foundations for the office buildings and tower at the Dock Street end were laid on 13 September 1887 and they were opened by the then Mayor of Newport Henry Faulkner on 1 May 1889. The High Street end was re-aligned and rebuilt in 1934, and comprised an arcade entrance to the market, shops, and a department store, Hills & Steele.

An extension at the High Street end was opened by Mayor Robert Frank Allen on 25 November 1987.

The market had been subject to plans for redevelopment since 2012. After being closed for a year, a modernised and refurbished version of the market was re-opened in March 2022.

== Facilities ==
Prior to its redevelopment in the 2020s, the market housed over 100 stalls over two floors offering a variety of fresh produce and stock. Stalls included a butchers, greengrocers, a fishmonger, a traditional confectioner's stall as well as being home to Newport's Welsh shop, Newport Welsh Gifts. An eclectic selection of Art and Craft stalls, coffee shops and hairdressers were located upstairs alongside the Jerome Gatehouse Collection Military band archive and a huge matchstick model of the Newport Transporter Bridge. The market also housed a Business Centre on the upper floors.

The newly refurbished (2022) market has market stalls and features a food court, where a central seating area is surrounded by a variety of independent food vendors. Rae Barton Fruit and Veg, who had been in the market for more than a century, retained its spot. Friendly Neighbourhood Comics also returned. Toy and ornament seller, City Treasures, relocated from Commercial Street. Other stalls included a candle shop, home decor stall, pet food shop, sustainable soap eco-shop and a vintage clothes shop.

Food and drink outlets include Deli Bach, Dirty Gnocchi, Meat and Greek, Rogue Welsh Cake Company, Seven Lucky Gods and The Greedy Bear. The space also includes 70 workspaces, a gym and a roof garden.

== 21st-century redevelopment ==
In April 2012 a £750,000 refurbishment scheme was approved by the Welsh Government, to upgrade and improve the layout and facilities. This was to be funded by a regeneration company, Newport Unlimited.

In 2018, developers Loft Co announced that Newport City Council approved their plans for a 250-year development lease with the council, subject to contracts, for a "24-hour working/living space with a tech hub, apartments and performance space while retaining market units and a food hall." Loft Co drew the plans in the style of their previous work on Cardiff's Tramshed, Barry's and Porthcawl's Jennings Building. In 2019 it was subject to a planning application for a £12m scheme to provide a mixed use site with a tech hub, apartments, and market units, as well as restaurants.

Only a few of the stallholders, about 5 of 35, planned to return after the development.

The refurbishment cost between £5 million and £6 million. The market was officially reopened by Newport City Council leader, Jane Mudd, at a ceremony on Thursday 17 March 2022.

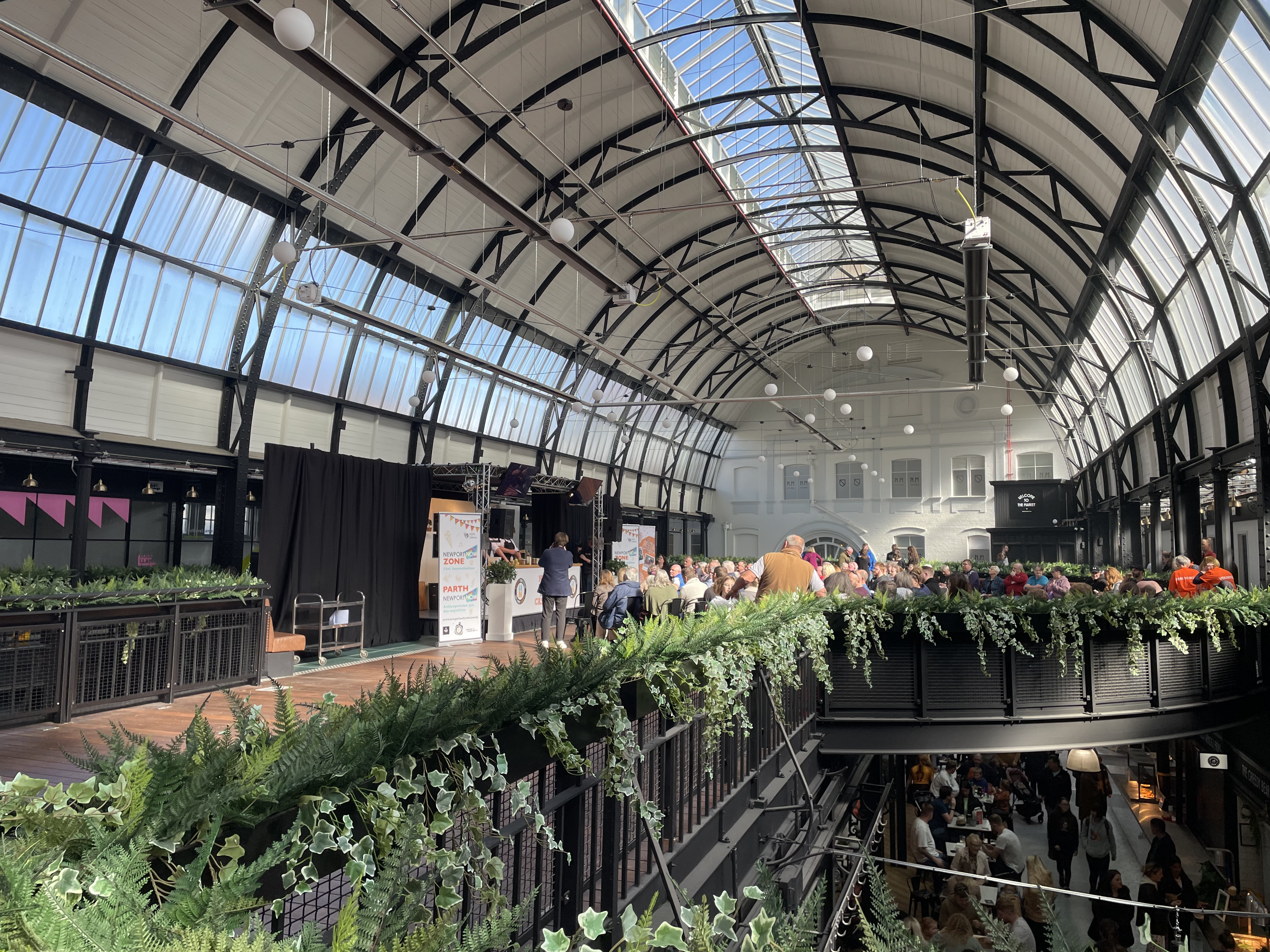
The first floor of the market, with a wide view of the refurbished building and Victorian roof

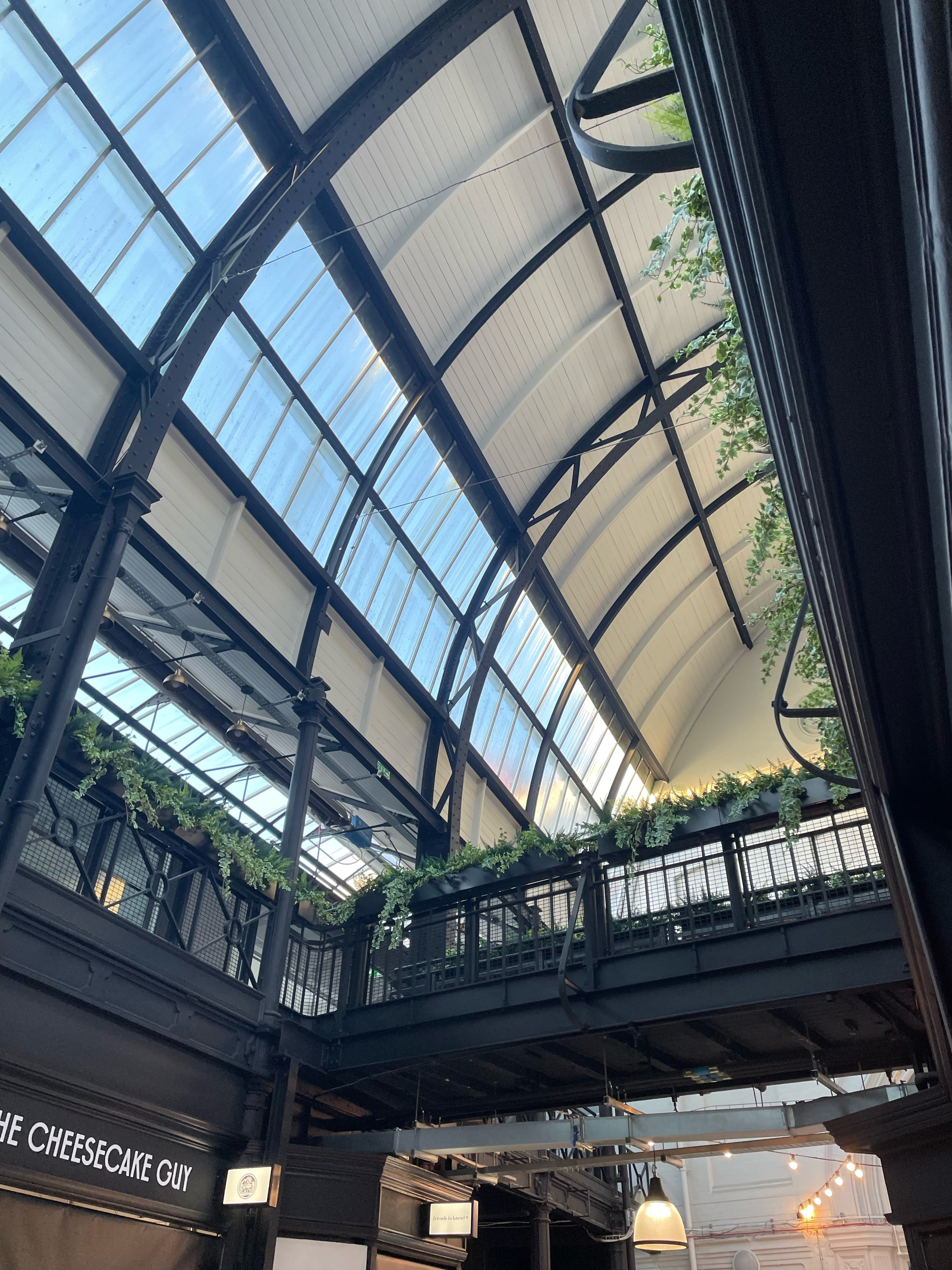
The renovated Market, highlighting the Grade II listed structure (2022)

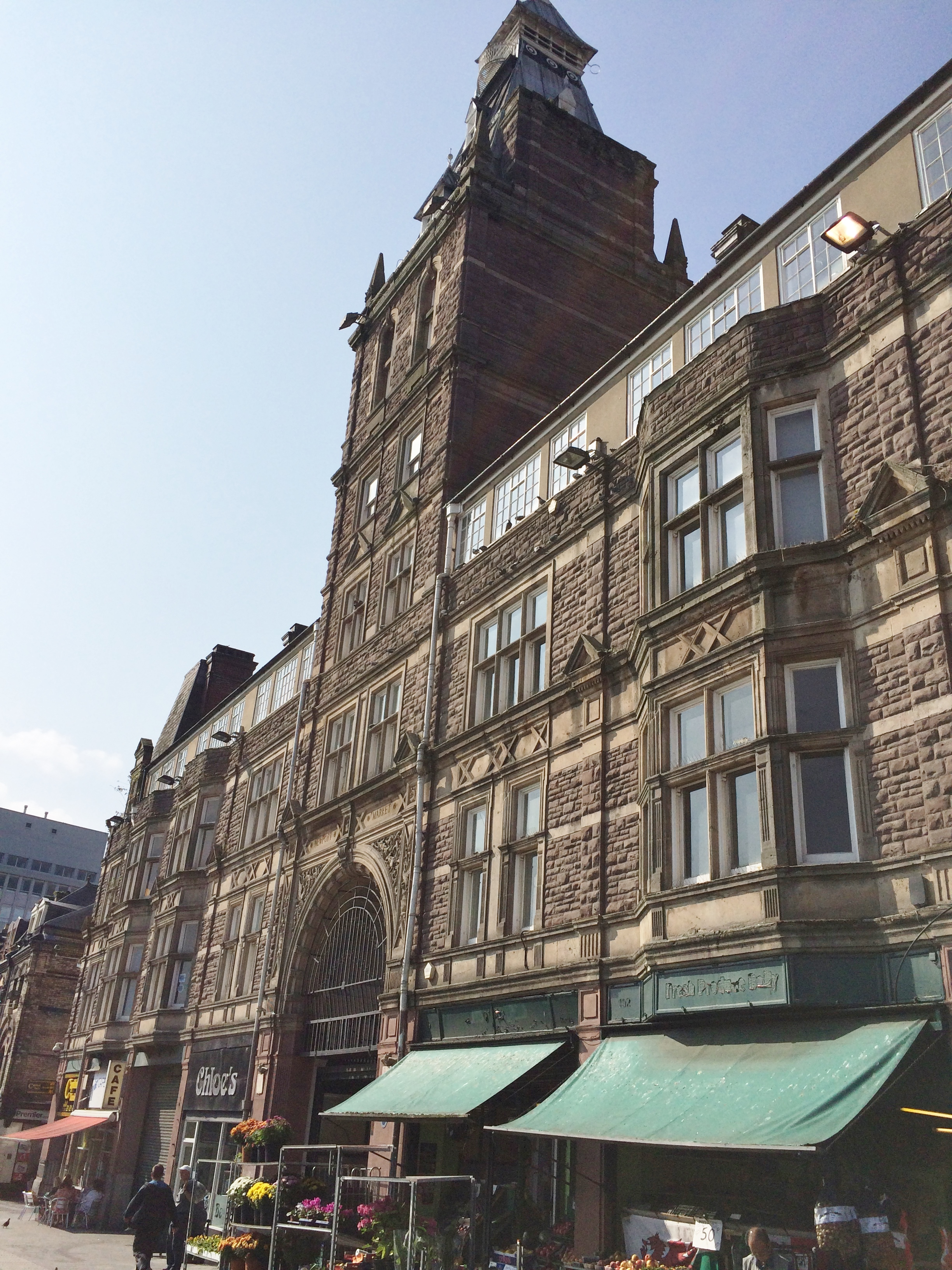
Newport Market, Upper Dock Street

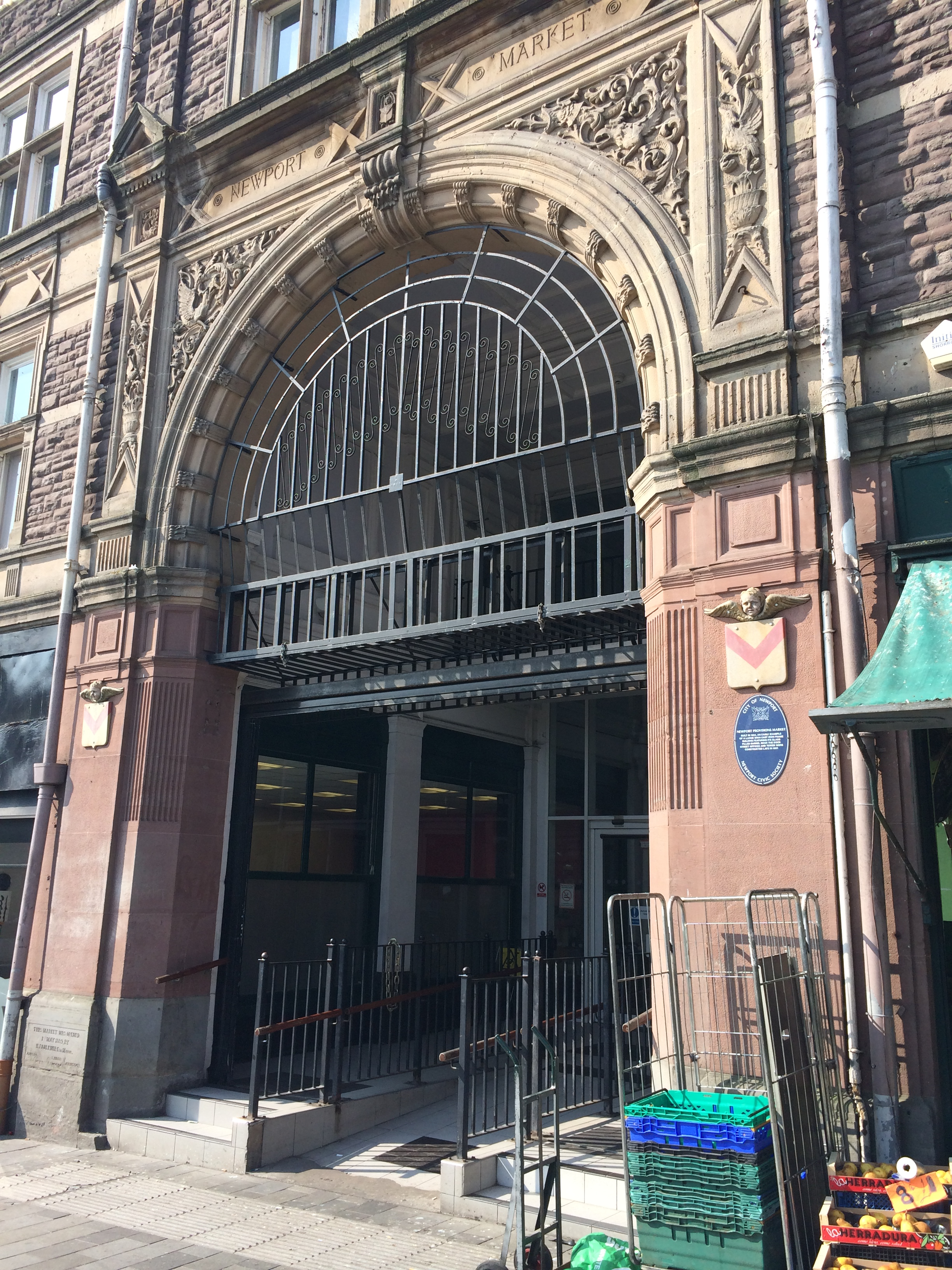
Newport Market, Upper Dock Street entrance

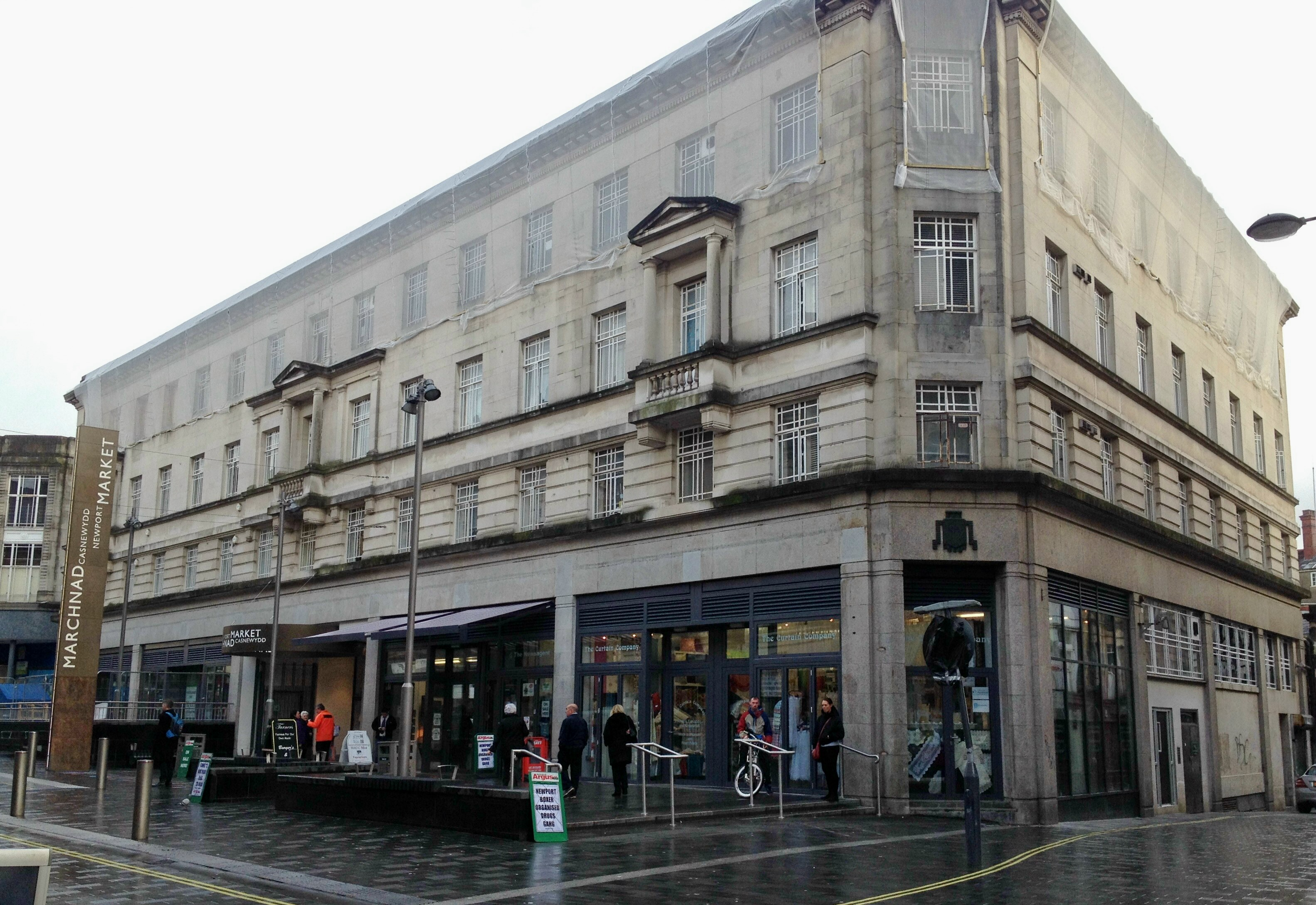
Newport Market, High Street Entrance

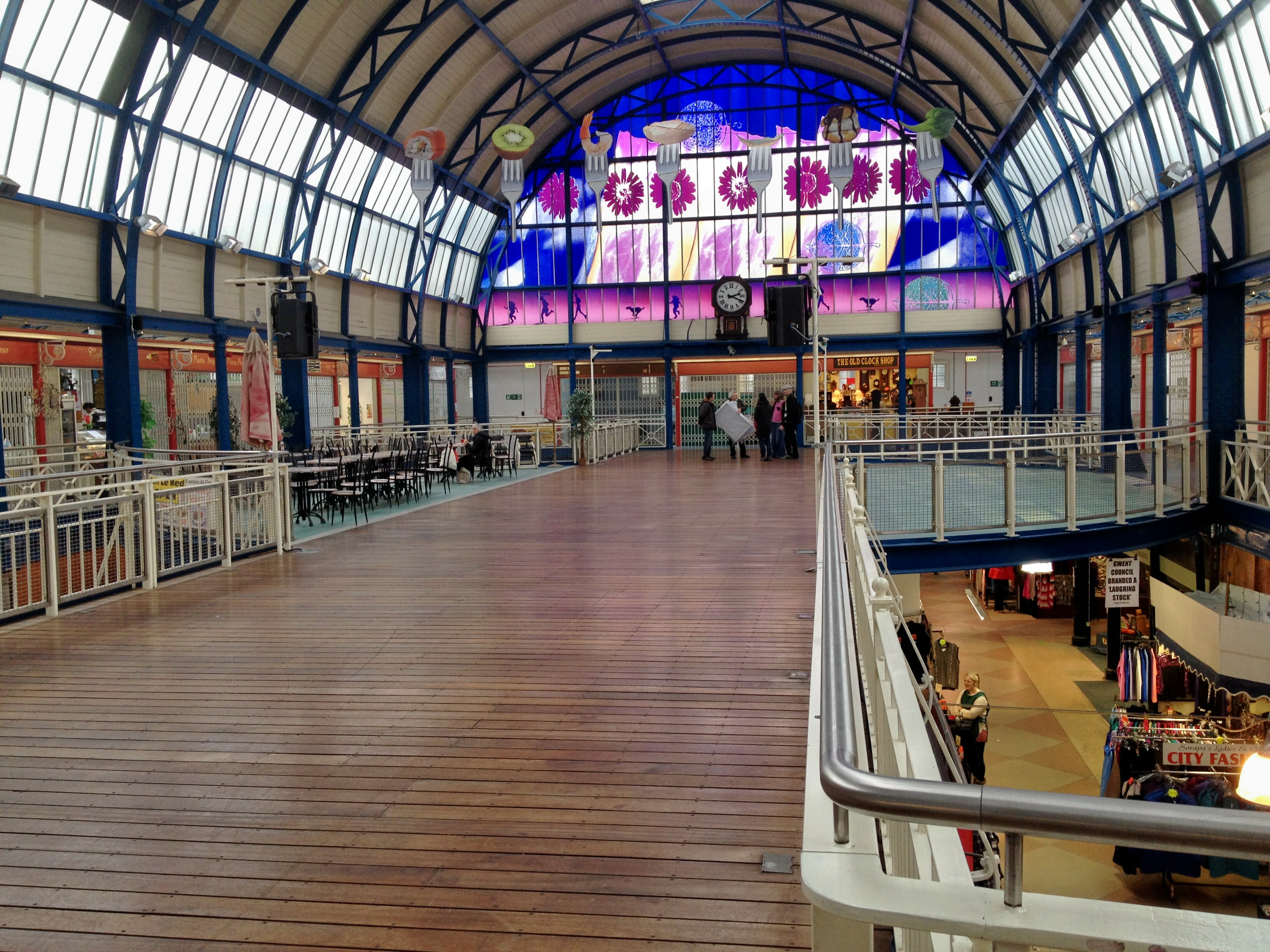
Newport Market interior

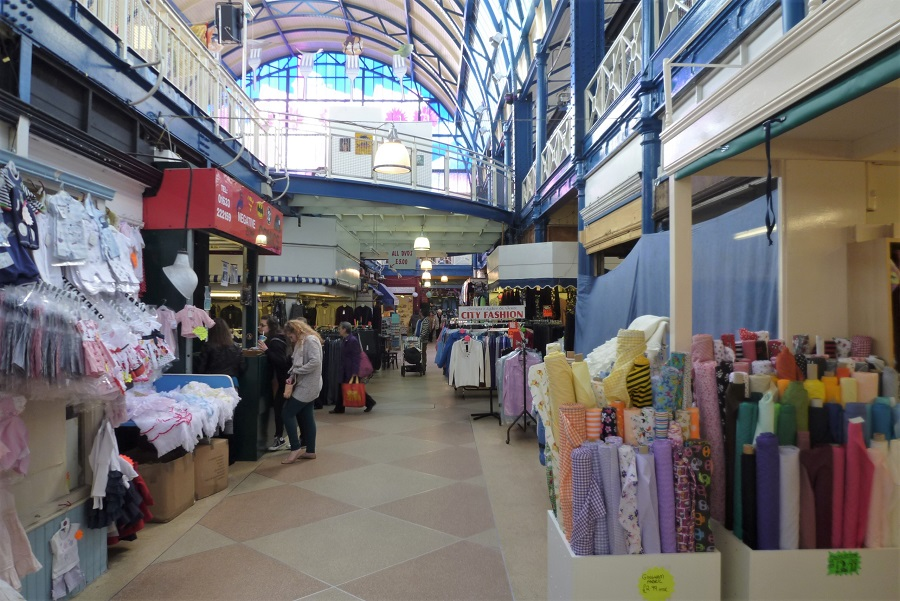
Newport Market interior, Griffin Street side

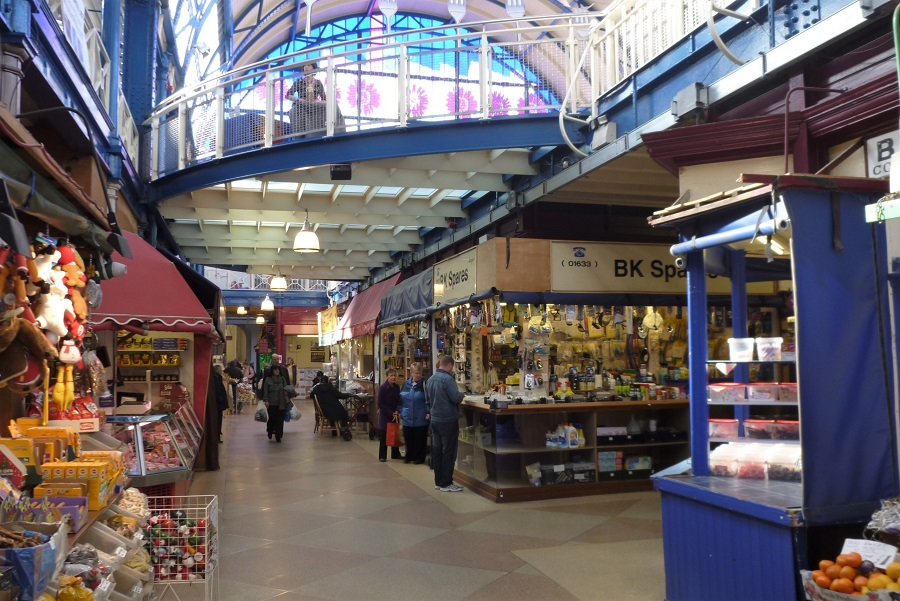
Newport Market interior, Market Street side

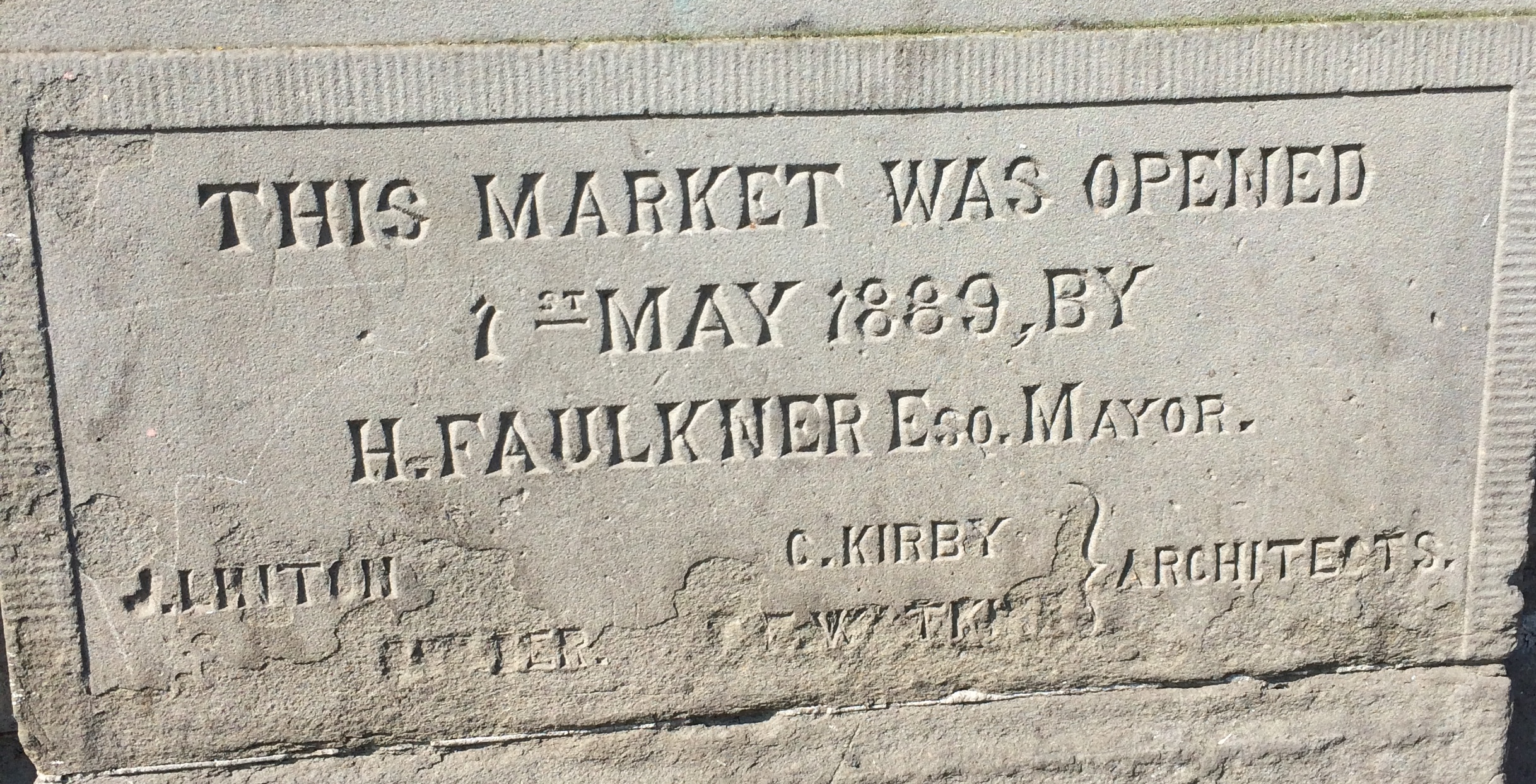
Newport Market foundation stone, Upper Dock Street entrance

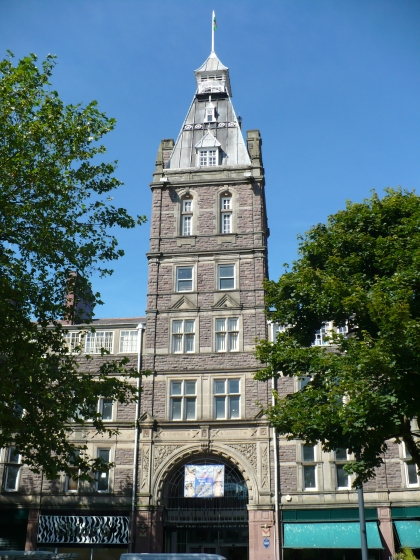
Viewed from Upper Dock Street

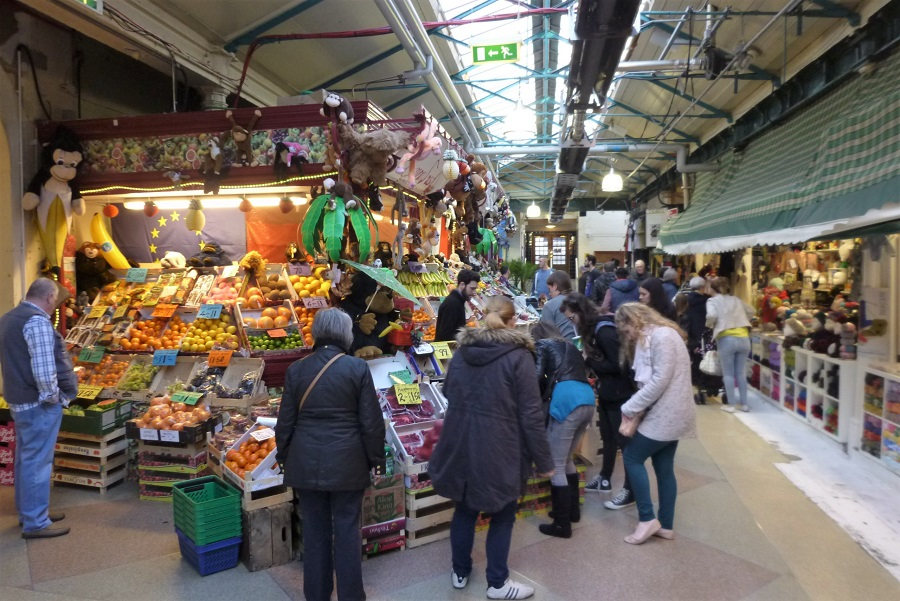
Fruit and veg stall near the west entrance (2015)
