= Kingsway Shopping Centre =

Kingsway Centre
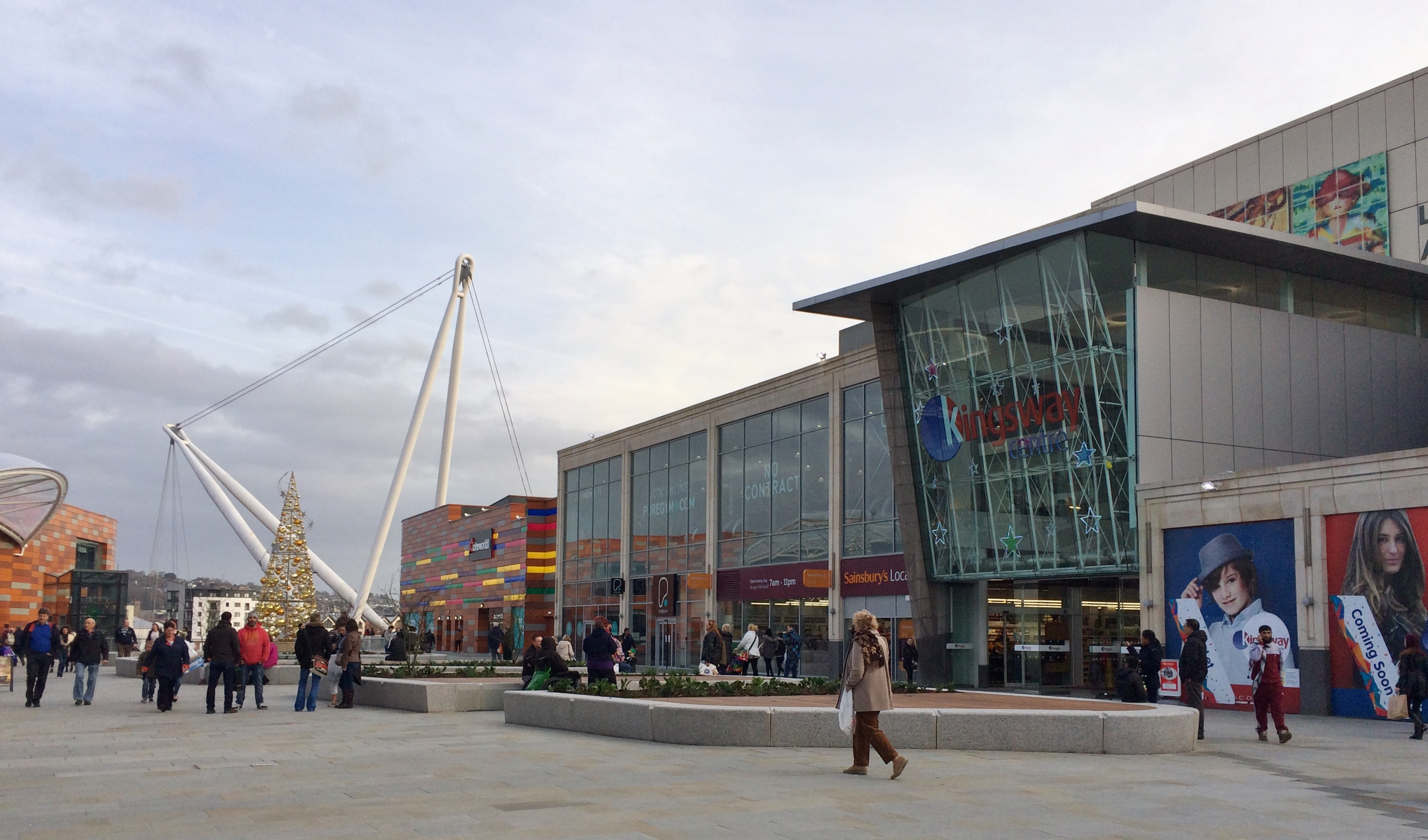
- Location: Newport, Wales
- Coordinates: 51.5859°N 2.9926°W
- Opened: 1968
- Developer: Sovereign Land and Schroder Exempt Property Unit Trust
- Owner: Niall Leighton-Boyce & Boyce Group ltd
- Floor area: 290,000 sq ft (27,000 m^{2})
- Floors: 2/3
- Website: kingswaycentre.com

The Kingsway Shopping Centre is an under-cover shopping centre in Newport city centre, Wales. The northern pedestrian entrance is on John Frost Square adjoining the Friars Walk shopping and leisure complex. The east pedestrian entrance is off Commercial Street. The west pedestrian entrance is on Emlyn Street. The centre is a short walk from the high street shops of Commercial Street and High Street. Newport railway station is also a short walk away.

The Kingsway car park on Emlyn Street has over 1000 spaces and the adjacent Friars Walk car park holds 350 cars, both accessed from the A4042 Kingsway.

Kingsway Centre includes a range of high street chain and independent privately owned shops. It is adjoining Newport Museum, Art Gallery and Central Library and it is close to Newport bus station. Kingsway Centre underwent a refurbishment and extension during 2007 and 2008.

In October 2014 the centre was bought by Bywater Properties and Queensberry Real Estate, the developers of Friars Walk.

In September 2023 Niall Leighton-Boyce of Boyce Group purchased the centre after previous owners went into administration in May 2023.
