= Newport city centre =

Area of Newport, Wales

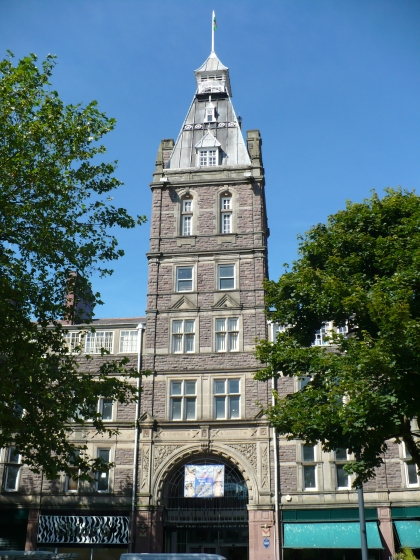
Newport Market Tower (1854) viewed from Upper Dock Street

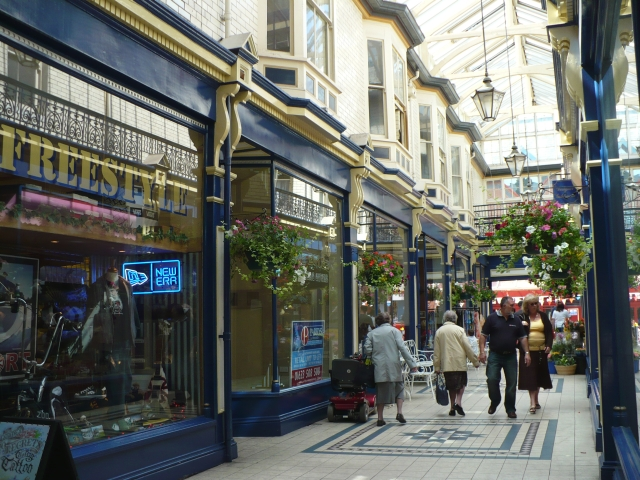
Newport Arcade looking towards Cambrian Road

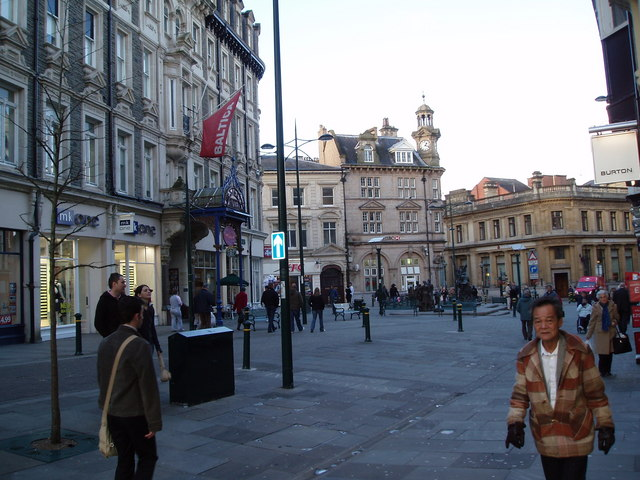
Junction of Commercial Street, Stow Hill and High Street in front of the Westgate Hotel

Newport city centre is traditionally regarded as the area of Newport, Wales bounded by the west bank of the River Usk, the George Street Bridge, the eastern flank of Stow Hill and the South Wales Main Line. Most of the city centre is contained within two conservation areas: the central area and the area around Lower Dock Street. Most of the city centre is located in the Stow Hill district.

== Description ==
The main shopping thoroughfare is Commercial Street, which forms part of the north–south axis of High Street, Commercial Street and Commercial Road, linking the heart of the city with Newport Docks. The streets were laid-out in 1807 by Sir Charles Morgan's Tredegar Wharf Company to connect the expanding docks with the main roads in the centre.

The area between Commercial Street and the river used to contain a mixture of railway lines and river wharves so the street pattern in this area was never fixed. On the removal of the railway lines and wharves in the 1960s the large John Frost Square (1977) and Kingsway Shopping Centre were built, close to Newport bus station. This area has been redeveloped to provide the Friars Walk shopping and leisure complex which was opened in November 2015. As part of this redevelopment, the Chartist Mural was destroyed.

Towards the northern end of Newport city centre is Westgate Square, named after the Westgate Hotel. Here, the five roads of Commercial Street, Stow Hill, Bridge Street, High Street and Skinner Street converge. This is generally regarded as the centre although the actual centre, as measured on road signs, is further up Bridge Street outside the Queen's Hotel where most OS maps pin point the centre.

On Upper Dock Street is the Chartist Tower, a 15-storey office block, built in 1966 and the tallest building in Newport. It features a secure underground car park. Radio transmitters and mobile phone masts are situated on the roof. During the 2014 NATO summit a security forces command and control team was housed temporarily in the building, with the top floor and roof being used as an observation post. In 2017 the building was sold as party of a £6.5M deal and has now been developed into a 163-bed Mercure hotel.

From Bridge Street, the two roads of High Street and Cambrian Road run in parallel towards Newport railway station. Joining the two roads is the covered Victorian Newport Arcade. At the western end of the arcade is the Cambrian Centre which is being redeveloped. To the east of High Street is Newport Market, a Grade II-listed building.

Kingsway/Usk Way is a boulevard on the west bank of the River Usk linking Newport Castle the Riverfront Theatre and the University of South Wales to the western ends of City Bridge and Newport Transporter Bridge. The city centre is currently being expanded to include areas on the east bank. The area between Newport Bridge and George Street Bridge is included in the Newport Unlimited master plan as a new high-density combined commercial and residential area, joined to the west bank by Newport City footbridge. The plan shows a strong urban form along the riverfront, emphasised with tall landmark buildings.

The city's major sports stadium, at Rodney Parade on the east bank of the River Usk, is a short walk from the city centre via Newport Bridge or Newport City footbridge.

== Business ==
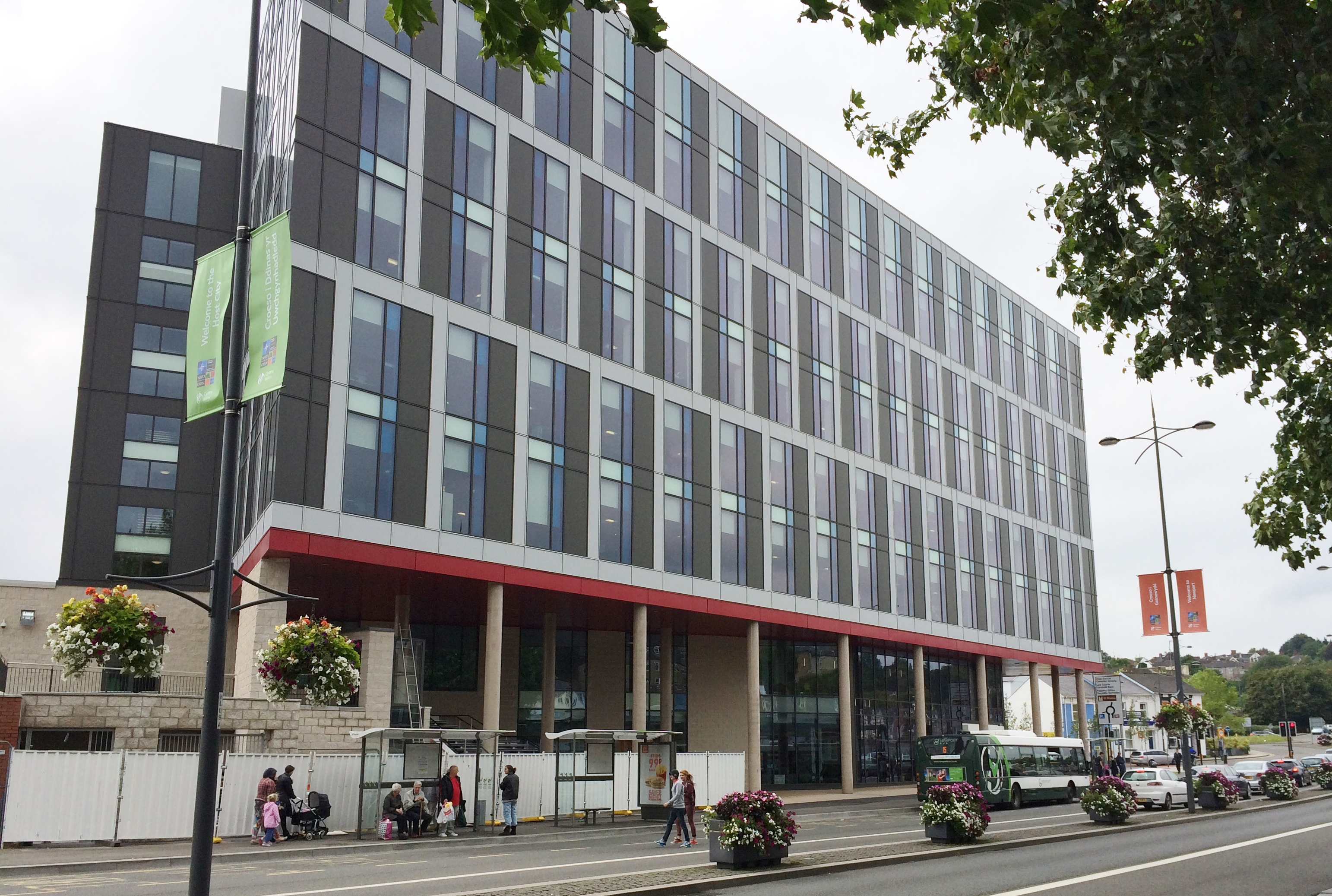
Admiral House, Queensway, Newport

Many of the non-retail city centre businesses are located on Bridge Street. In 2014 Admiral Insurance opened a large newly constructed office opposite Newport railway station.

=== Chartist Tower ===
The 16 storey Chartist Tower is the tallest building in Newport, and is currently undergoing a £10m redevelopment into a mixed use building by developers, set to include a hotel, 30,000 sq. ft of office space and 18,000 sq. ft of ground floor retail space.

== Shopping ==
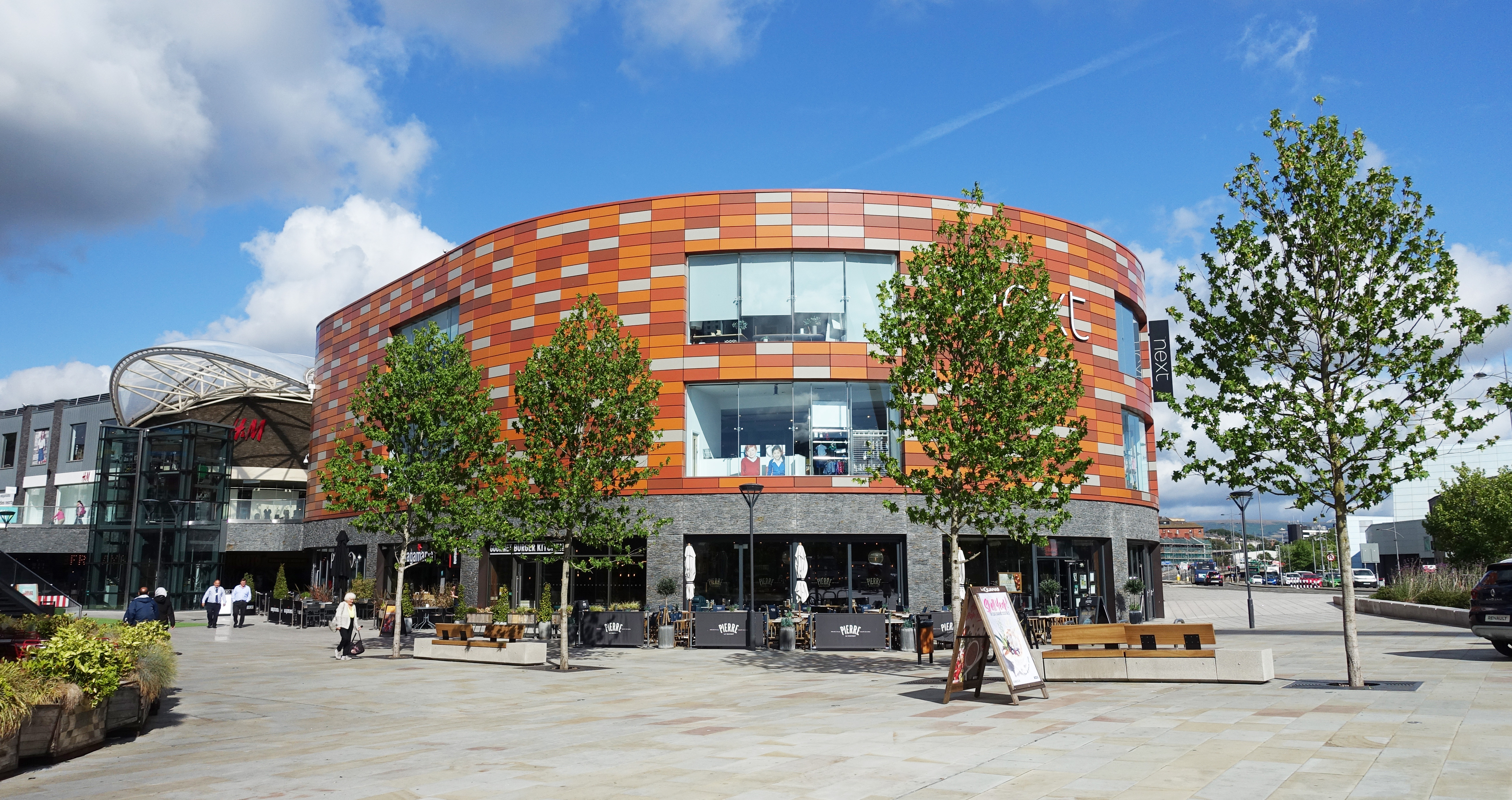
Friars Walk

Newport's city centre shops are concentrated along the pedestrianised High Street, Commercial Street and adjoining roads. Friars Walk shopping and leisure complex and, linked by John Frost Square, the adjoining Kingsway Shopping Centre are the main under-cover shopping areas. The city centre has suffered from competition from Cwmbran Centre and out-of-town shopping areas at Newport Retail Park to the east and retail parks around Maesglas to the west. The protracted development of Friars Walk was also cited as a reason for high street stores, such as Marks and Spencer, leaving the city centre during the 2010s.

=== Friars Walk ===
Friars Walk is a partially under-cover shopping centre and leisure complex with several levels, and a range of high street shops, eateries, a bowling alley and a soft play area.

=== Kingsway ===
Kingsway Shopping Centre is an under-cover shopping centre and a car park with over 1000 spaces. It offers a range of high street and privately owned shops, adjoining Newport Museum, Art Gallery and Central Library. It is close to Newport bus station, and was redeveloped in 2008.

=== Cambrian Centre ===
The Cambrian Centre is a small shopping centre in Cambrian Road in Newport city centre. Among other units, it houses one of the city's Wetherspoon's public houses, the John Wallace Linton.

A planning application by Holder Mathias Architects was approved in 2007 by Newport City Council for an £87 million redevelopment and refurbishment to be known as City Spires but it was mothballed in 2008 before construction started. An alternative redevelopment plan was started in 2012. The first phase of development, Admiral House, was opened in 2014.
