= Dolman Theatre =

Theatre in Newport, Wales

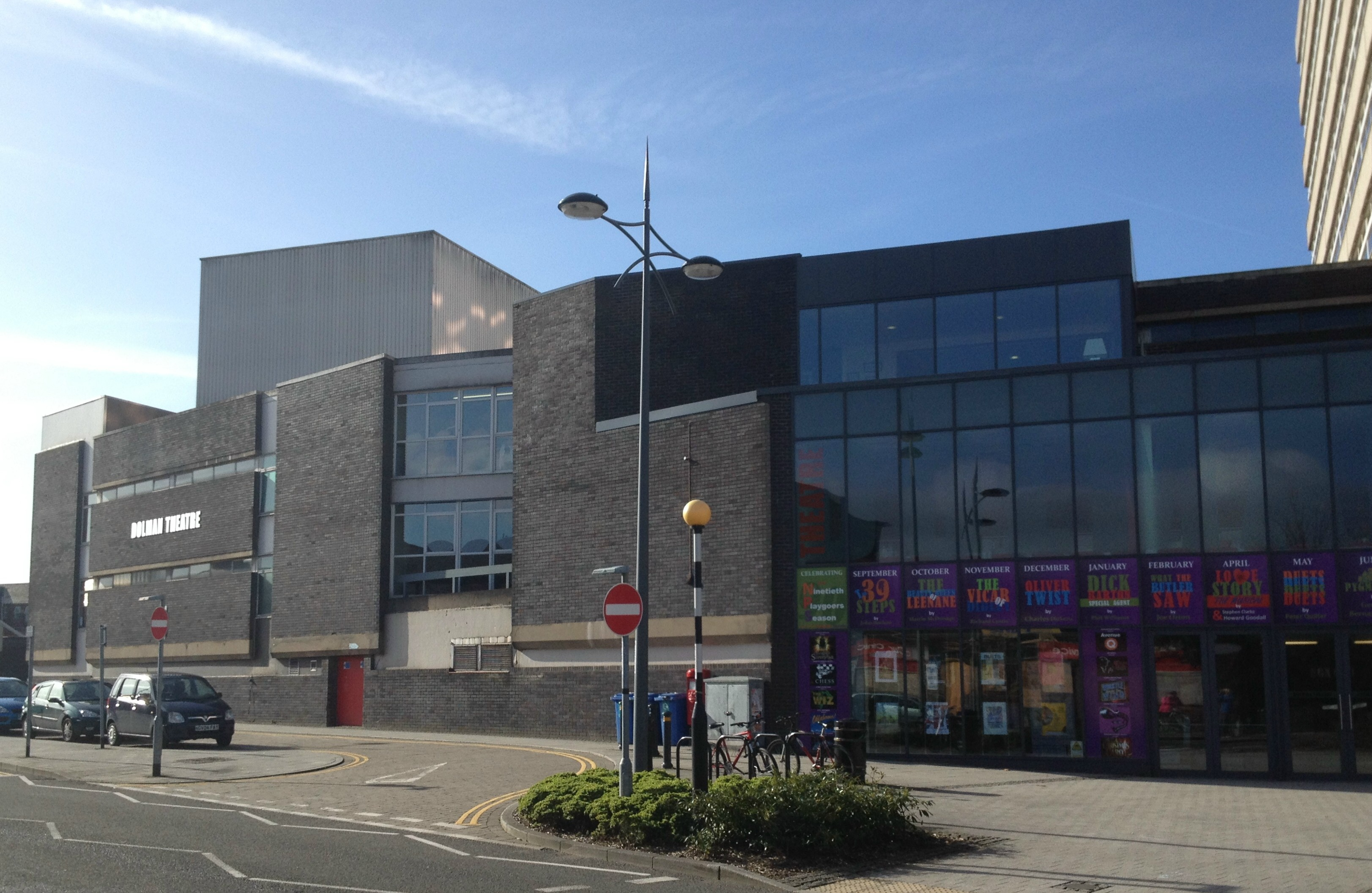
Dolman Theatre, Kingsway, Newport

The Dolman Theatre is located in the city of Newport, Wales, United Kingdom. The theatre was formally an integral part of Kingsway Shopping Centre until major restructuring of the shopping centre forced what was the main entrance of the theatre (from inside the shopping centre itself) to be closed; the theatre was refurbished in 2005, with what was the main entrance from inside the shopping centre becoming a single-door emergency exit into Kingsway Shopping Centre; along with this change the side of the theatre facing onto Emlyn Square Road was drastically rebuilt with a new glass frontage and redesigned box office and foyer-bar area to match the rest of the renovations also (and still) in progress throughout the city.

The theatre is solely owned by Newport Playgoers Society which is one of the leading amateur theatrical companies in Wales and has been so since 1924. The Dolman, however, was purpose-built in 1967 to include a 400-capacity auditorium, three large rehearsal rooms and a 60-seat studio, and replaced an older theatre, the Newport Little Theatre and Arts Centre, housed in the converted St James’ church and adjacent properties. The new theatre in 1967 retained its previous name, being renamed to The Dolman Theatre after the death of Arthur Dolman, a long time member and leading light of Newport Playgoers, and without whose sterling negotiations it is doubtful that the new theatre would have been built. https://www.southwalesargus.co.uk/news/15525186.from-the-archive-newports-dolman-theatre-celebrates-its-50th-anniversary/

The main stage in the auditorium is of Proscenium design with also an orchestra pit which can be mechanically raised to technically change the staging design to that of a thrust stage. The 60-seat studio space (which often doubles as a rehearsal room) is a flexible acting space, capable of almost any stage setup. The theatre is often hired by outside amateur theatre groups who pay to use the theatre and its facilities; there are only two internal groups within the theatre that use the main stage, these are the Newport Playgoers and Dolman Theatre Works (the junior branch of Newport Playgoers, for ages 11–18). This later became PNG (Playgoers New Generation) which performed both main stage and studio performances. The foyer area contains a fine mural designed and painted by Hans Feibusch. The theatre is a registered charity run by volunteers for the community of Newport and the surrounding area.

== Mural ==
The theatre houses a mural of an early travelling theatre painted by German artist Hans Feibusch in 1967. There are also extensive murals by Feibusch inside Newport Civic Centre.

== Associated Groups ==
The Dolman theatre is associated with a large number of theatrical, performing arts and musical groups such as:

- Newport Playgoers Society
- Sharon Higgins School of Dance
- Dolman Theatre Works
- GLD Dancing School
- Gwent School of Dancing
- Gwent Young Farmers Club
- Kaleidoscope
- Le Clare School of Dance
- Newport Operatic Society
- Newport Pantomime Society
- Playgoers New Generation
- Newport Scout and Guide Gangshow
- Beechwood Dancers
- Centrestage Cymru
- The MAD Theatre Company
