= Usk Railway Bridge =

Great Western Railway Usk bridge
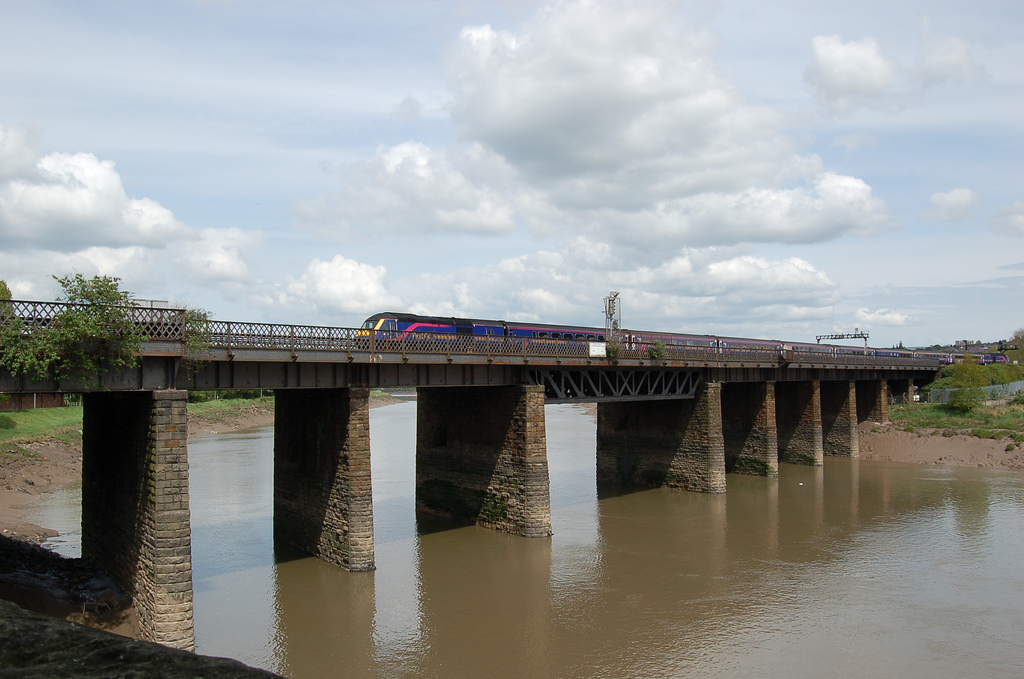
- First Great Western High Speed Train crossing the River Usk.
- Coordinates: 51°35′28″N 2°59′40″W
- Carries: Railway
- Crosses: River Usk
- Locale: Newport
- Owner: Network Rail
- Maintained by: Network Rail

Rail characteristics
- No. of tracks: 4
- Track gauge: 1,435 mm (4 ft 8 1/2 in)
- Electrified: 25 kV 50 Hz AC OHLE

The Usk Railway Bridge is a railway viaduct in Newport city centre, Wales. It crosses the River Usk in an east—west direction, carrying the Great Western Main Line.

The original bridge was constructed for the South Wales Railway and designed by Isambard Kingdom Brunel. Brunel's viaduct, which was primarily constructed of creosote-treated timber, suffered a catastrophic fire near completion, resulting in substantial delay and its rebuilding. The redesigned structure used considerably more wrought iron in place of wood, and included the first use of the now-common bow-string-shaped girder. This first bridge was opened to traffic during 1850.

During the late 1880s, a second bridge was constructed alongside the first, which benefitted from a simpler design in comparison to the first. During the 1910s, the second bridge was extended to accommodate a quadruple track configuration, enabling the original bridge to be retired during 1925. During 2019, the lines across the second bridge were electrified as part of the 21st Century upgrade of the Great Western Main Line.

== History ==
=== Origins and predecessors ===
The origins of the Great Western Railway Usk bridge are closely connected with the early history of the Great Western Railway (GWR) and its chief engineer, Isambard Kingdom Brunel. The directors of the GWR had resolved to construct a trunk route between London and Swansea, running though various cities and major settlements in between. During the 1840s, Brunel, who had been put in charge of surveying and selecting the line's route, arrived in Newport for the purpose of planning how the South Wales Railway would traverse various geographic challenges, which included a means of carrying the line across the River Usk.

Brunel decided that a viaduct would be the optimal means of crossing the river and designed such a structure. Possessing eleven spans and stretching to a length of 1,200 ft, this viaduct was largely composed of timber, which was treated with creosote under pressure as to sufficiently weather-proof it. Construction work commenced during 1846. The total cost of the viaduct's construction reportedly exceeded £20,000. However, its extensive use of wood heavily contributed to the bridge's destruction just prior to completion. On 31 May 1848, as the final arch was being put into place, a heated bolt used to rivet a beam together ignited the flammable creosote; within the space of six minutes, a catastrophic fire had spread across the whole structure, setting the opening back by years.

Brunel swiftly redesigned the bridge explicitly to prevent any recurrence of fire. Recognising that starting from scratch would set the line's completion back even longer, he decided to incorporate the remaining structural elements into the new bridge. While some elements continued to use wood, wrought iron plates and girders were also adopted; the remaining wooden elements were subject to a different treating method, known as chyanizing. In his redesign of the bridge, Brunel effectively invented the now-common bow-string-shaped girder to replace several of the wooden sections originally used.

By 1850, the Usk railway bridge was effectively complete, and the first trains crossed it that same year. It would be in service for exactly 75 years, being retired during 1925 and dismantled soon thereafter, having been replaced by a newer bridge alongside.

=== Current bridge ===
In 1888, the original bridge was supplemented with a second one, which was made largely of stone. Its deck, made of metal, made use of a lattice, or criss-crossing, design to enable the supporting girders to resist bending forces; it was considered to be of a simpler and more routine design than its predecessor. By 1911, the second bridge had been widened to accommodate the running of four lines across its deck, in anticipation of the first bridge's retirement. During 2019, the tracks across the second bridge were electrified as part of the 21st Century upgrade of the Great Western Main Line. For several years prior, the bridge was subject to preparatory and improvement works to renew the structure, which included numerous repairs and all exterior surfaces being repainted during temporary closures.
