= Friars Walk, Newport =

Friars Walk
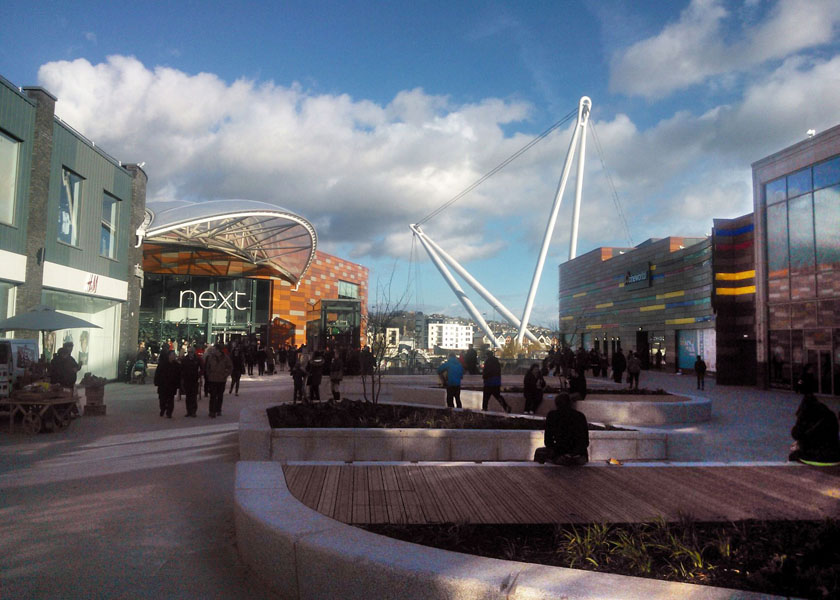
- John Frost Square, Friars Walk
- Location: Newport, South Wales
- Coordinates: 51.5859°N 2.9926°W
- Opened: 12 November 2015
- Developer: Queensberry Real Estate
- Owner: Cyrus Capital Management
- Floor area: 390,000 sq ft (36,000 m^{2})
- Floors: 3
- Website: friarswalknewport.co.uk

Friars Walk is a partially under-cover shopping centre and leisure complex in Newport city centre, South Wales. It has several levels and includes a range of high street shops, eateries, a cinema, a bowling alley and a soft play area.

== Development ==
The site was originally planned by Modus Corovest, however these were scrapped in 2009 due to the 2008 financial crisis.

Plans were revived in a £100 million public-private scheme by Queensberry Real Estate and Newport City Council in 2012. Plans included a six-screen cinema, ten pin bowling alley, eight restaurants and a 350 space carpark. A new bus station was also included, with finance coming from a £90 million loan from Newport City Council.

The new design was by Leslie Jones Architecture. Construction began in April 2014. The scheme opened on 12 November 2015, raising Newport from 200th to 77th in the UK's retail rankings and heralded as a "lifeline for Newport". The total cost came to £117 million.

== Location ==
The complex is linked by the redeveloped John Frost Square to the Kingsway Shopping Centre, Newport Museum, Art Gallery and Central Library and Newport bus station. The complex is a short walk from the high street shops of Commercial Street and High Street. Newport railway station is also a short walk away.

The Friars Walk car park holds 350 cars and over 1,000 spaces are available in the adjacent Kingsway multi-storey car park, both accessed from the A4042 Kingsway. There are cycle racks located in Usk Plaza.

== Ownership ==
The ownership of the site has been the source of discussion due to the decision of the freeholder, Newport City Council, to not disclose the beneficial owner of the headlease, and therefore not reveal the recipient of the substantial subsidy payments for empty units, which amounted to £1 million over two years as of 2022.

The site was developed by Queensberry Real Estate after a loan agreement in a public-private partnership with Newport City Council. However this left the council open to shortfalls for empty units, prompting it to agree a subsidy arrangement with Queensberry which ensures that the Council pays compensation (up to a cap) for empty units in the development.

In June 2017, the site's developer Queensberry Real Estate sold the centre to Talisker Corporation, the Canadian owner of Main Square in Toronto, and Canyons Resort in Park City, Utah.

It emerged that the leasehold interest in the site (Friars Walk LH Limited) had changed hands in early 2022. Wales Online repeatedly sought to obtain these details through a Freedom of Information request but the Council initially refused stating that "the disclosure of information relating to [...] financial or commercial performance could likely affect future business dealings along with the reputation of the parties concerned".

In July 2023 it was reported that the rights to the subsidy payment had been sold separately to the ownership of the lease on the site, to a Jersey based business named Old Star Finance.

In January 2024 it was confirmed that Cyrus Capital Partners Europe LLP were the new beneficial owners of the headlease. The business is a subsidiary of the Anglo-American hedge fund of the same name, which specialises in "complex, structurally distressed investments". The European business is run by Lucien Farrell, who has made "investments in over 100 companies, the majority of which would be considered stressed or distressed companies" including the now defunct British airline Flybe.

== Chartist Steps ==
The steps connecting Usk Plaza to John Frost Square are inscribed with the six points of the People's Charter to commemorate the Chartist movement and the Newport Rising of 1839 led by John Frost.

== Gallery of Friars Walk ==
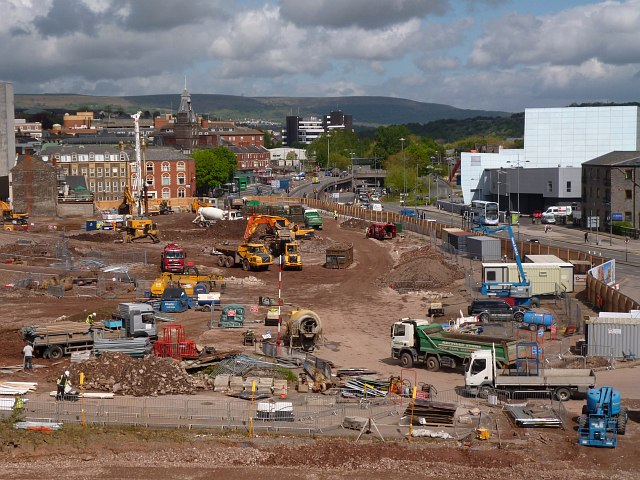
Friars Walk during construction

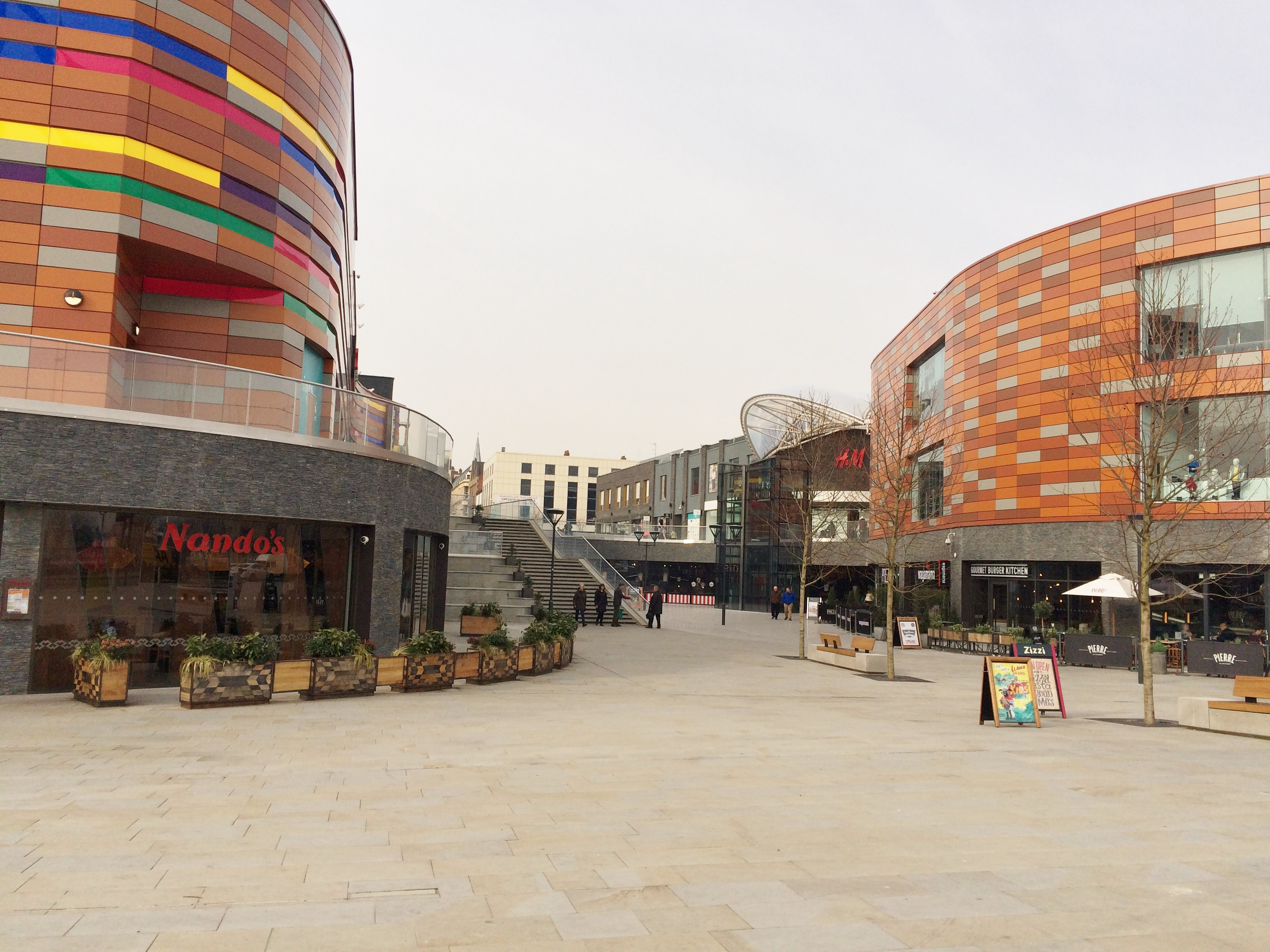
Usk Plaza, Friars Walk, 2015

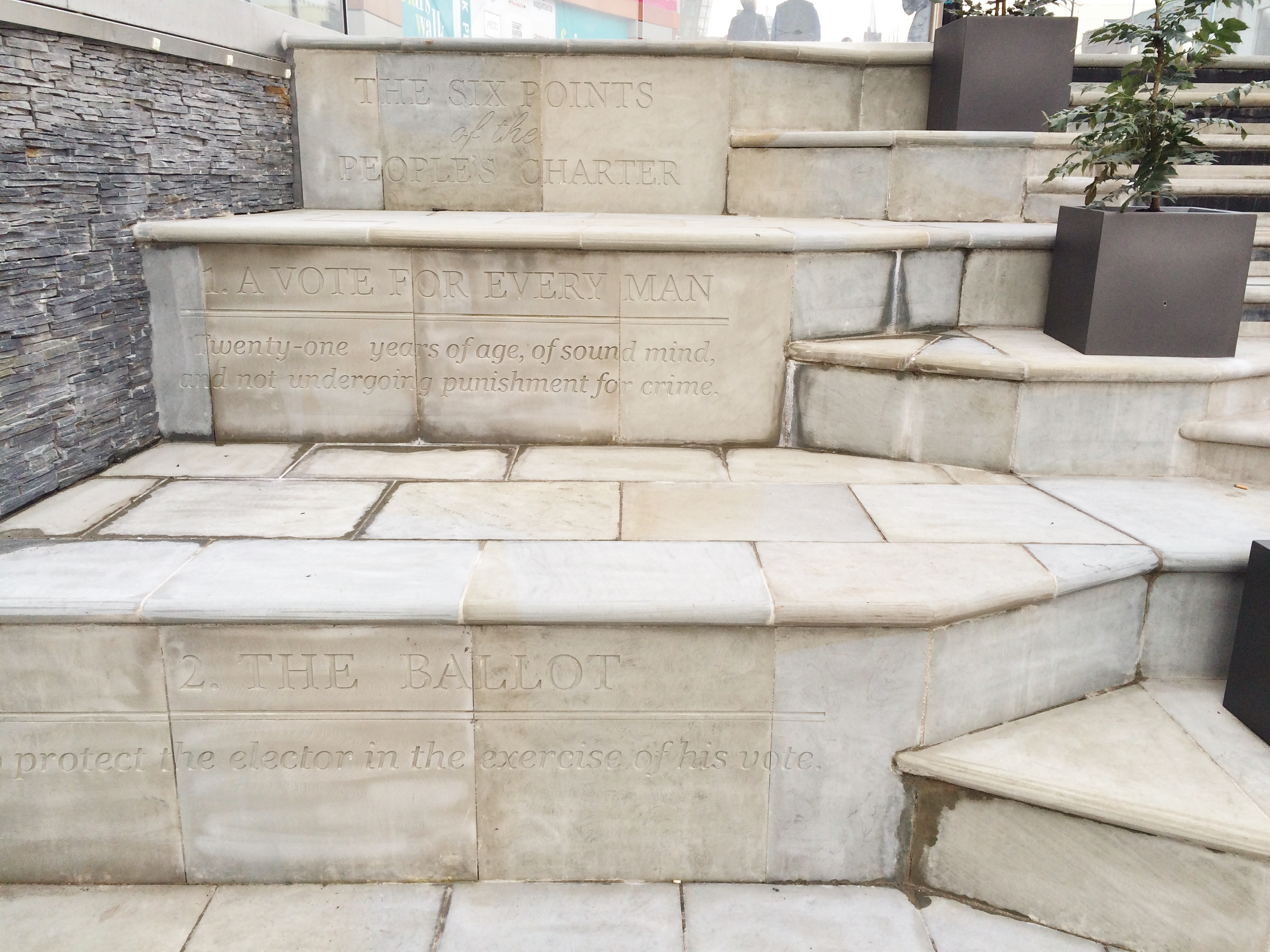
Chartist steps (upper), Friars Walk

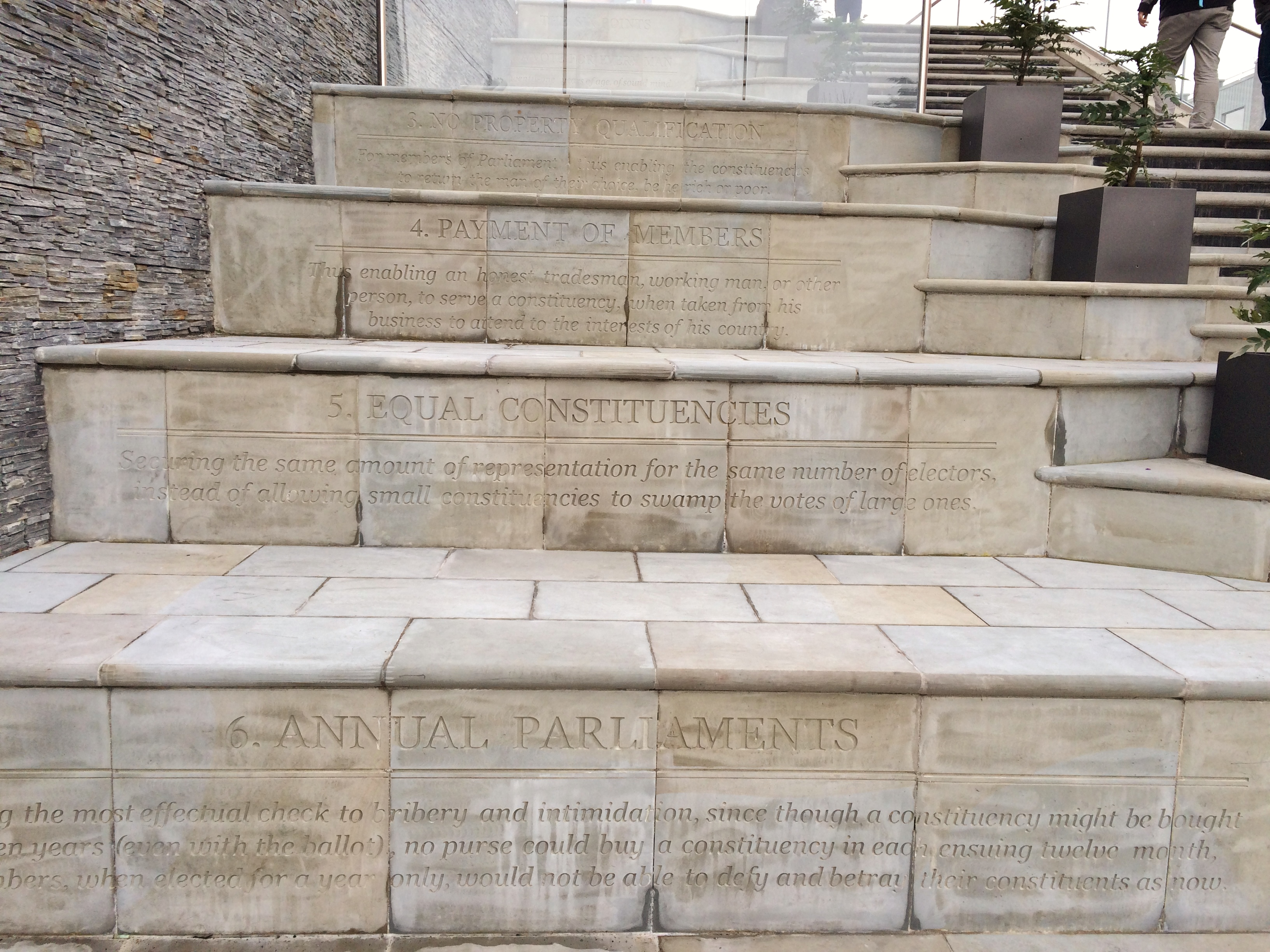
Chartist steps (lower), Friars Walk

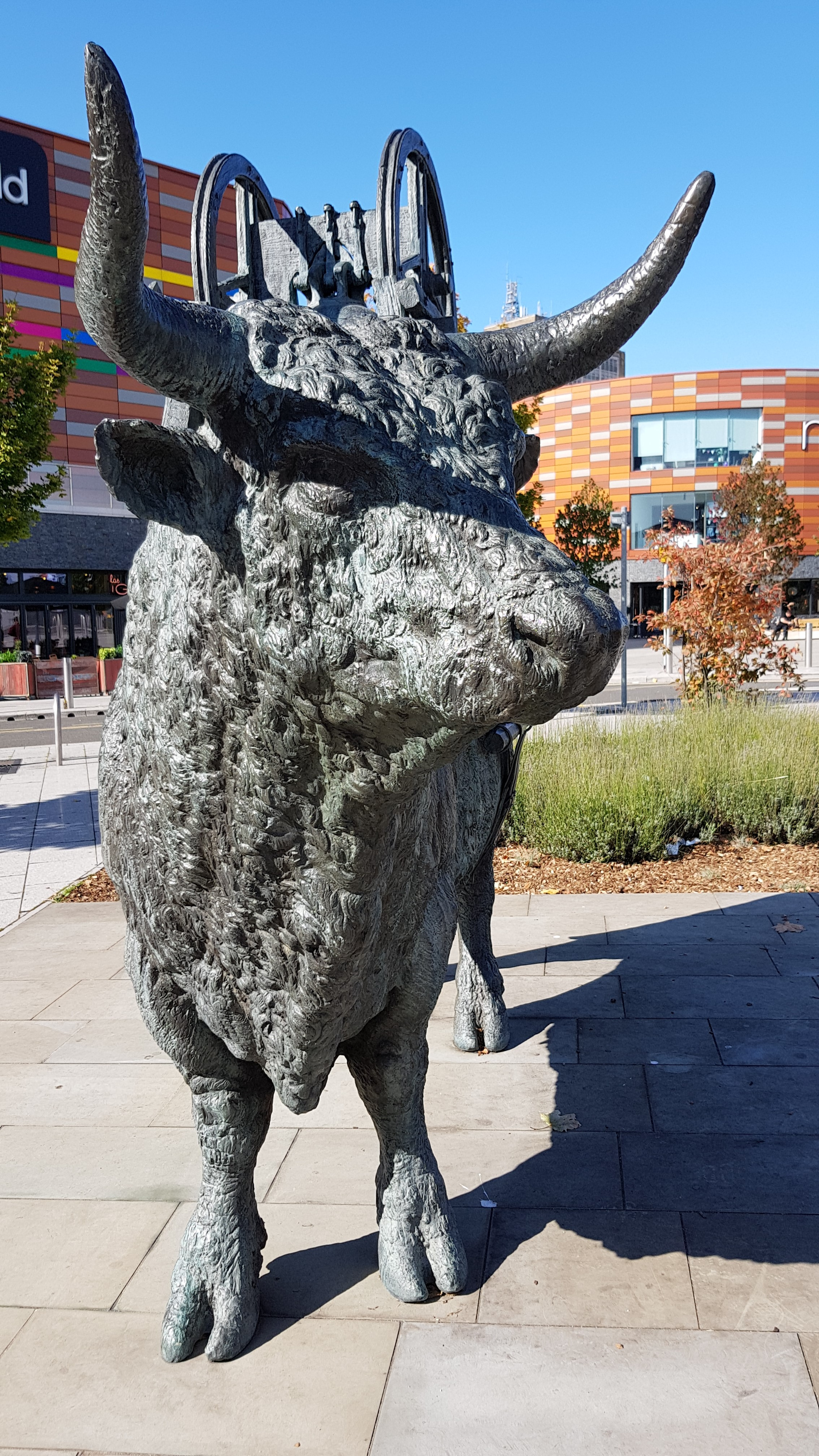
Sculpture of Vision of Saint Gwynllyw by Sebastien Boyesen

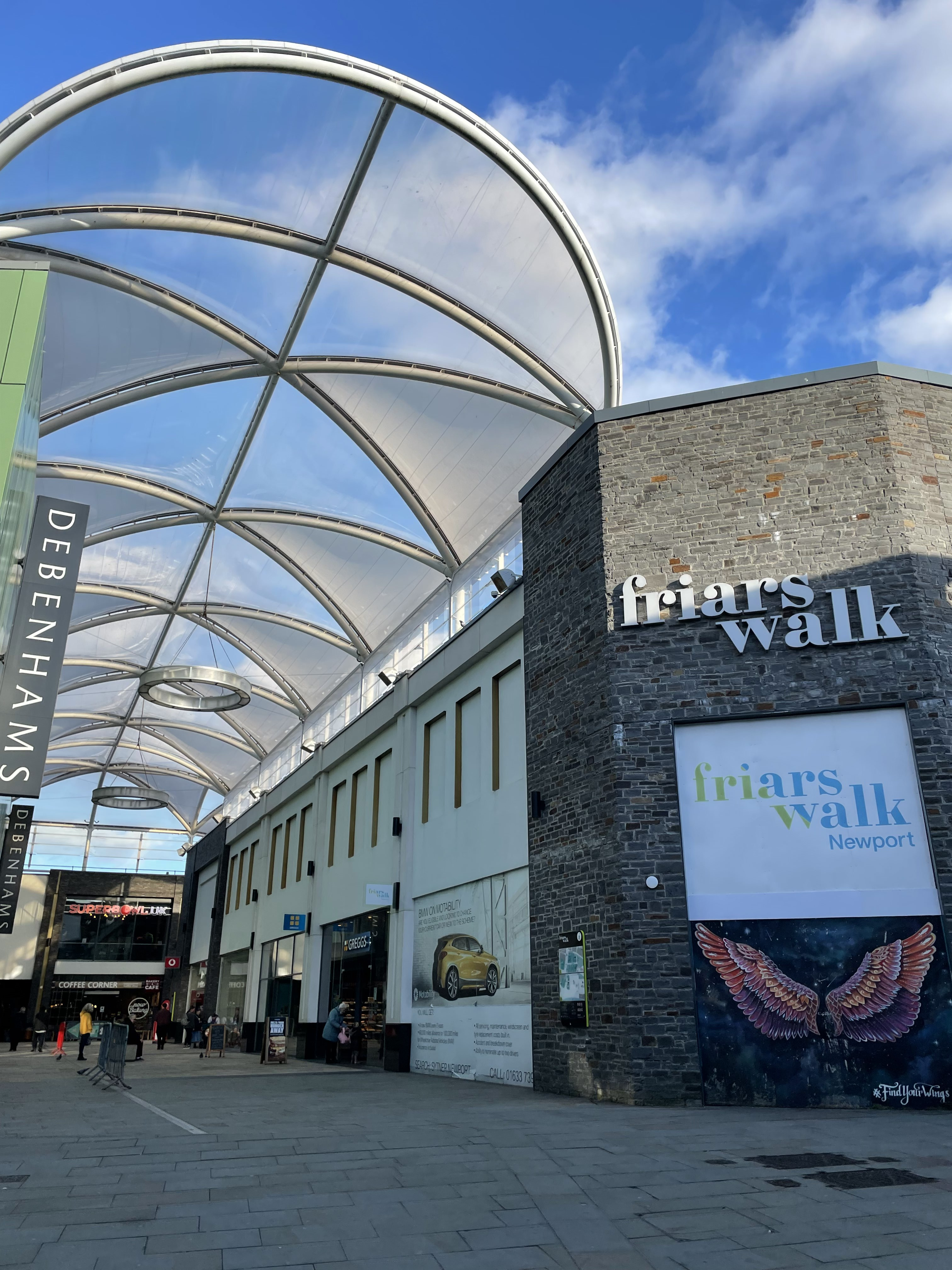
Viewed from Austin Friars, to the south west
