= Newport bus station =

Bus terminus and interchange in Newport, Wales

Newport Central Bus Station Gorsaf Fysiau Canol Casnewydd
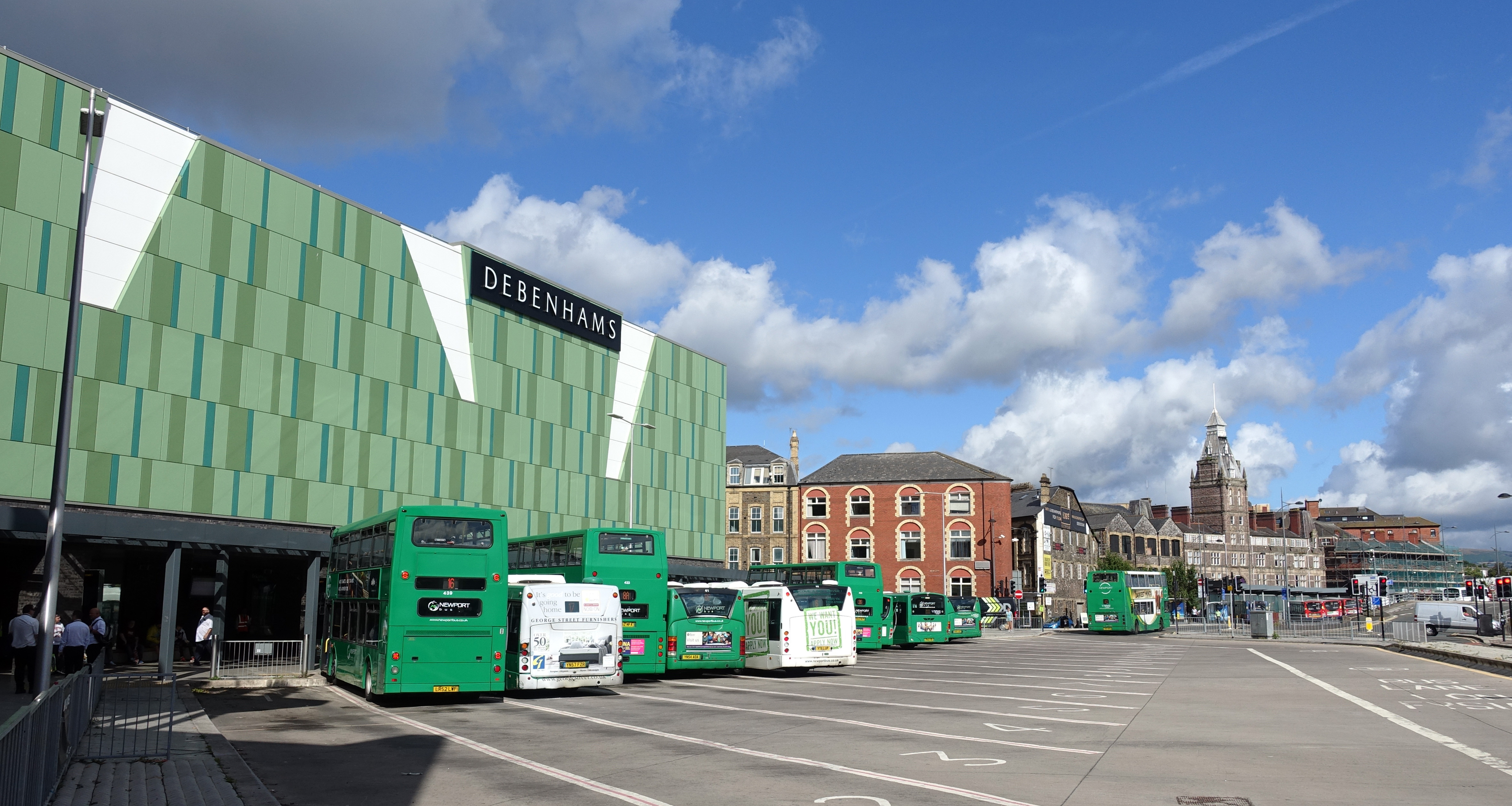
- Newport (Market Square) bus station in 2014

General information
- Location: Newport Central Bus Station; Friars Walk Shopping Centre; John Frost Square; Newport; NP20 1EA; Wales
- Coordinates: 51.58744°N 2.99385°W
- System: Bus station
- Owner: Newport City Council
- Operator: Newport City Council
- Bus routes: 53
- Bus stands: Total: 24 stands Friars Walk: 15 stands Market Square: 9 stands
- Bus operators: Newport Bus, Stagecoach in South Wales, Phil Anslow Coaches, Cardiff Bus
- Connections: Cardiff, City Districts, Risca, Cwmbran, Chepstow, Monmouth, Blackwood, Pontypool, Blaenavon, Tredegar

Construction
- Parking: None
- Cycle facilities: Racks
- Accessible: Level boarding

Other information
- Status: Staffed; Monday – Friday: 07:00 – 18:30; Saturday: 09:00 – 12:00, 12:30 – 16:00
- Station code: nwpdjpw
- Fare zone: Zone 1 (Newport Bus)

History
- Opened: 11 December 2015
Location

Newport Central bus station (Welsh: Gorsaf fysiau Canol Casnewydd) is a bus terminus and interchange located in the city centre, Newport, South Wales. It is the largest road transport hub for public services in the county. It is situated on the Newport Market site and the adjacent Friars Walk site.

== Background ==
The Newport Bus Station was previously a 26-stand facility located to the south of the current site. The bus station was not popular, with only 1% of customers being 'very satisfied' with the facility in a 2009 survey. It was demolished in 2014 (and relocated) as part of the city centre redevelopment.

== Redevelopment ==
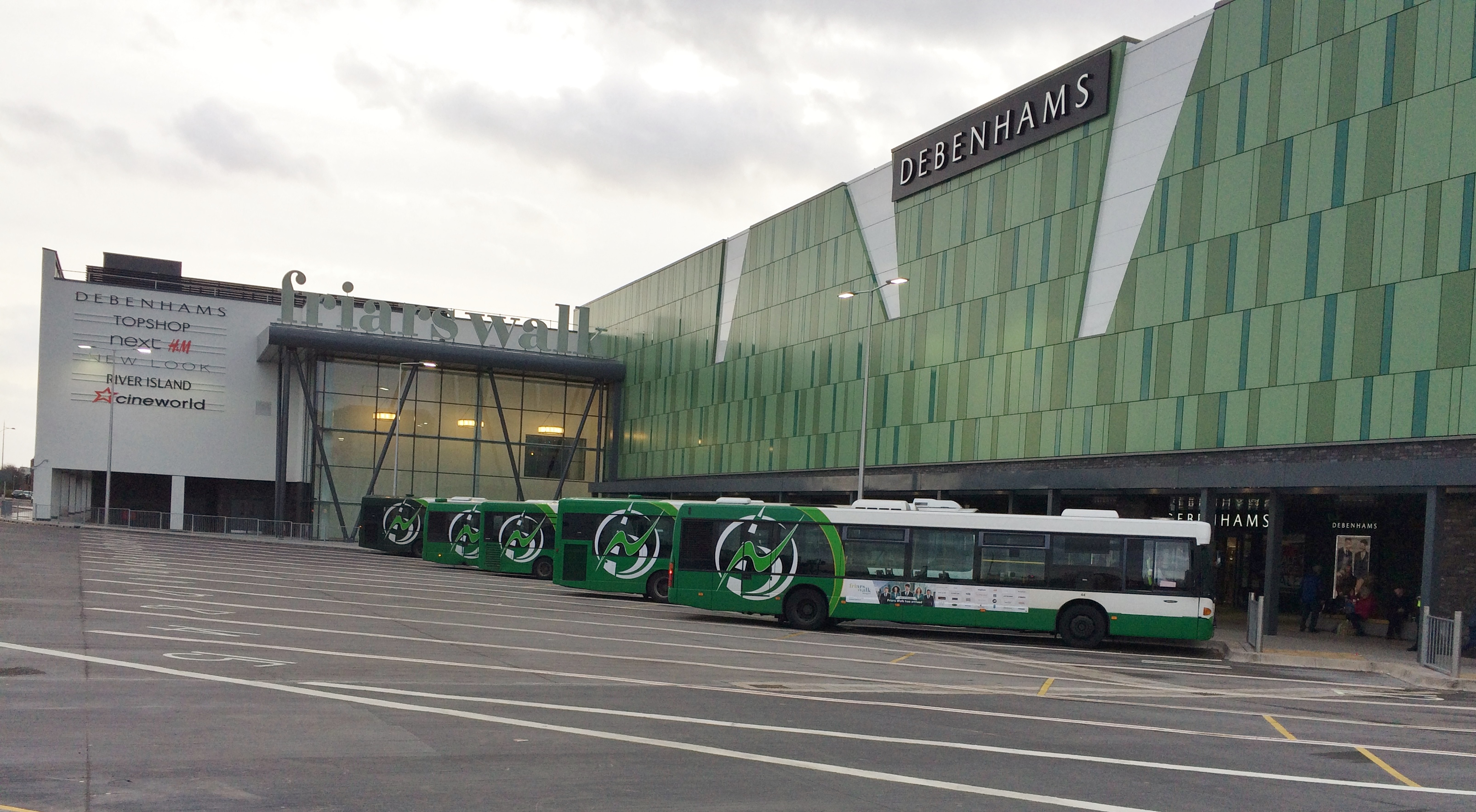
Newport bus station, Friars Walk, Newport

The bus station and surrounding area was part of the Friars Walk development scheme. A new 9-stand bus station was opened outside Newport Market in December 2013 and a second adjoining site with 15 stands, incorporated into the new Friars Walk shopping and leisure complex, was opened in December 2015.

== Layout ==
The bus station is set on large and open forecourts and the buses park facing the pickup point on arrival and reverse out on departure. The pedestrian areas are under cover, although not strictly 'inside'.

== Services ==
The Friars Walk site is used by Newport Bus services around the city as well as to Cwmbran, Chepstow and Monmouth. The market site is used by Newport Bus demand-responsive transport services, Phil Anslow services to Cwmbran, and Stagecoach South Wales services to Cwmbran, Pontypool and Blaenavon, Caerphilly, and Rogerstone, Risca and towns in the Sirhowy Valley. The Newport Bus and Cardiff Bus services to Cardiff have also temporarily departed from the market site since 2021.

Long-distance coach services do not depart from the bus station. Flixbus services pick up from outside Newport railway station and National Express services from outside the Riverfront Arts Centre, on the other side of Kingsway from Friars Walk.

== Rail links ==
Newport railway station is an eight minute walk from the Friars Walk bus station, and six minutes from the Market Square stand nearby. From there, services are provided by Great Western Railway and Transport for Wales on the South Wales Main Line, Welsh Marches line and Ebbw Valley Railway.

== Facilities at the station ==
There is a selection of facilities at the bus station.

There is a covered walkway with lifts that links the station with the Friars Walk shopping centre as well as being located next to the former Debenhams and Supernews.

There are also public toilets located near the station.
