= Newport Retail Park =

Shopping center in Newport, Wales

Newport Retail & Leisure Park
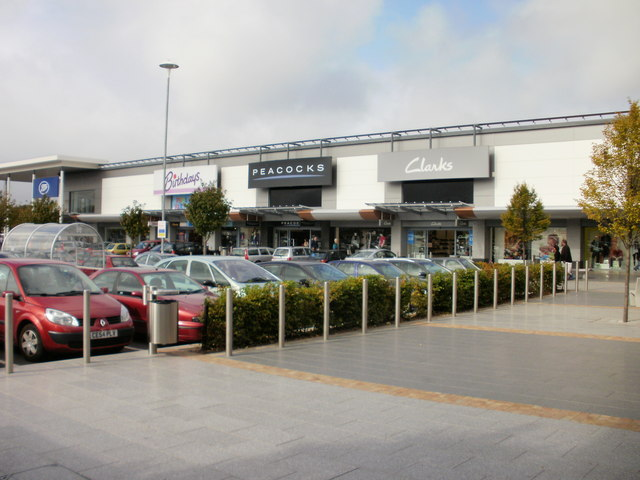
- From left to right, Boots, Birthdays, Peacocks, and Clarks
- Location: Newport, Wales
- Coordinates: 51°34′37.32″N 2°56′44.77″W
- Address: Spytty Road
- Opened: 1 January 1996; 30 years ago (retail park)
- Owner: Stadium Developments (retail park); Monmouthshire Council (leisure park)
- Website: www.newport-retailpark.co.uk

Newport Retail and Leisure Park is an out-of-town shopping centre in the city of Newport. The centre opened on 1 January 1996, South East Wales. It is located in the Lliswerry area of the city and is accessed via the Southern Distributor Road (which connects to junction 24 of the M4 motorway).

== Retail park ==
Newport Retail Park is the town's principal out of town retail destination and home to major occupiers including M&S, Next, Boots and Outfit. Other brands include H&M, Tapi Foot Asylum, Clarks, Nando's and Caffe Nero. There is also a Tesco Extra supermarket.

The retail park has 31 retail units in total and extends to 311,500 sq ft, with 828 car park spaces.

== Leisure park ==
The 141,000 sq ft Leisure Park includes a 13-screen Cineworld cinema, xercise4less gym, Home Bargains superstore, Innoflate trampoline park and a range of restaurants such as McDonalds, Burger King, Pizza Hut and Harvester. The 11-acre site has 705 free car spaces and links through to the Newport Retail Park and Tesco Extra on the Eastern side of the city.

The Megabowl bowling alley was previously empty but has now been refurbished. The site lay empty from 2005 until 2016 when the building became three new retail units.

In 2019, Monmouthshire Council borrowed £21m to purchase Newport Leisure Park with the rental income used to support local services. Following concerns raised about the acquisition, the council's auditors confirmed that the process followed was legal.
