= High Street, Newport, Wales =

Historic main street of Newport, South Wales

Coordinates: 51.5887°N 2.9970°W

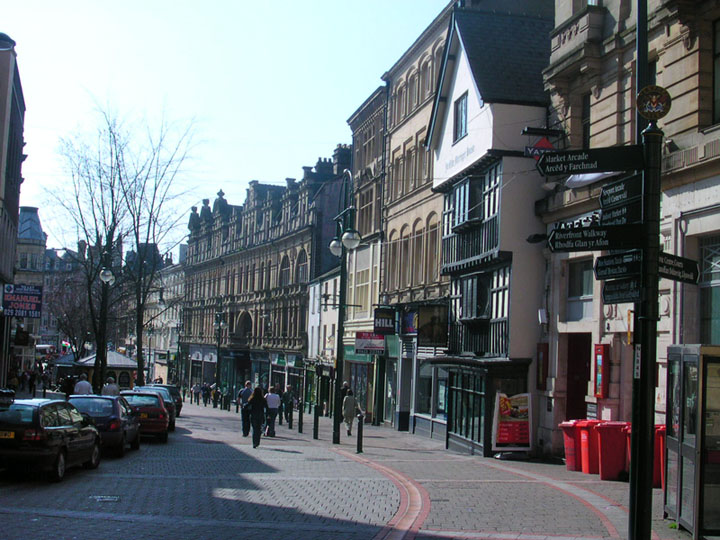
High Street, Newport (2005), looking south

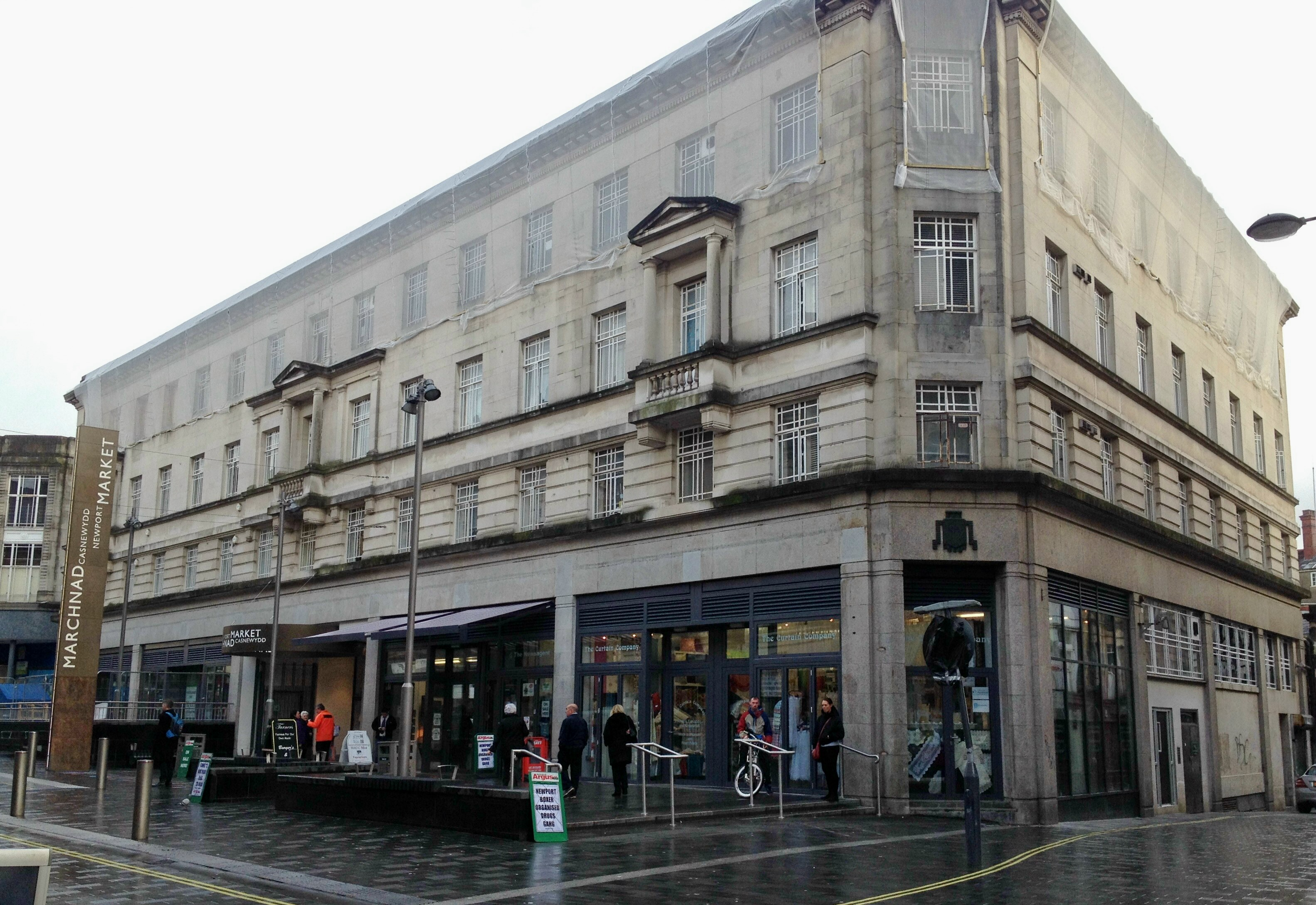
Newport Market, High Street entrance and modern pedestrianisation (2014)

High Street is the main historical street and the original main thoroughfare in the centre of Newport, South Wales. Today it runs for approximately 280m between Westgate Square and the Old Green roundabout (facing Newport Castle).

== Description ==
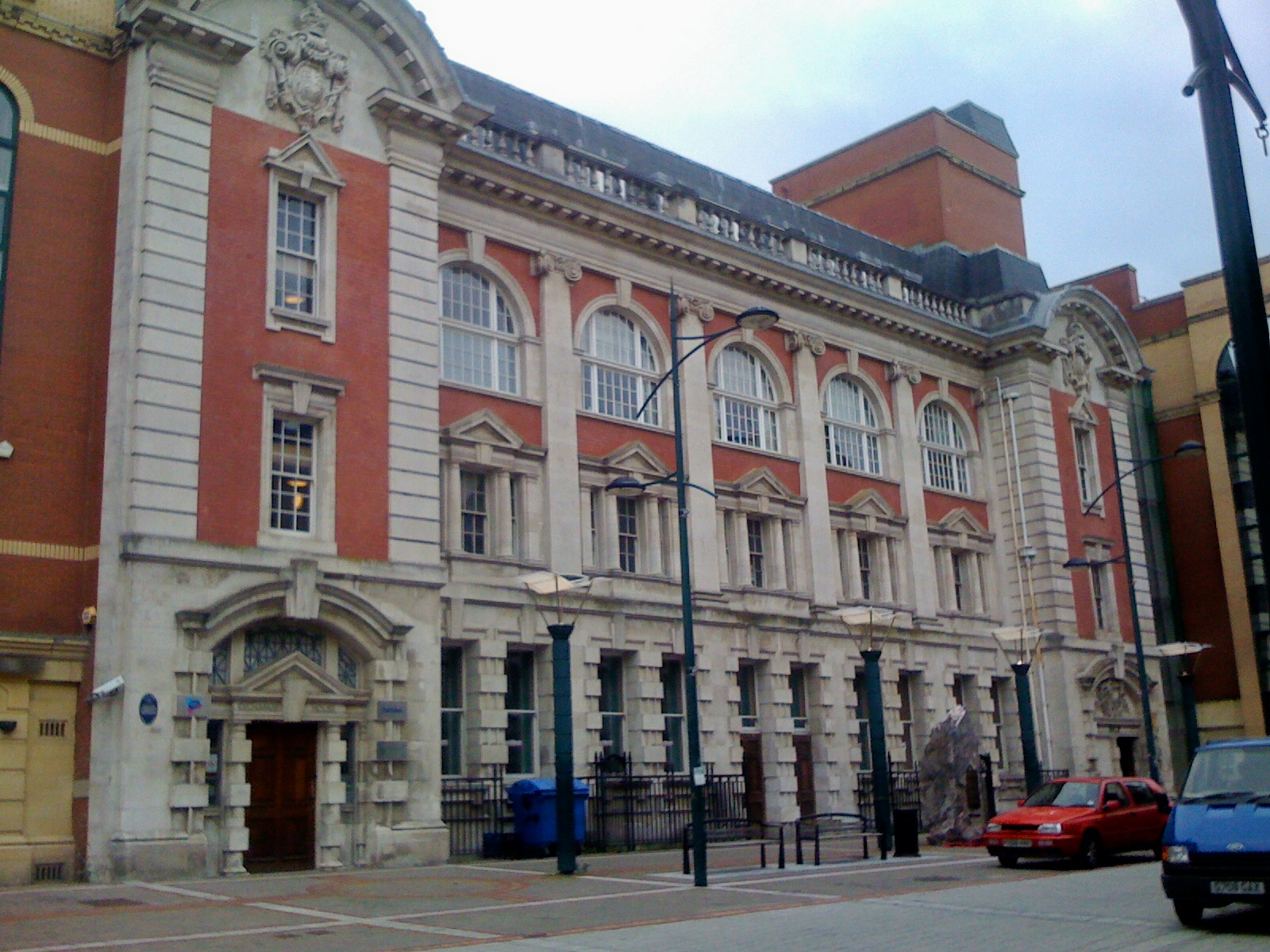
The façade of the former main Post Office, High Street

Newport's High Street runs southwest from Newport Castle and Newport Bridge through the city centre, turning south approximately four-fifths of the way along its length. Landmarks along the street include the Kings Head Hotel building, the facade of the Old Post Office (now disguising a multi-storey carpark), Ye Olde Murenger House pub, Newport Market and Newport Arcade. Since the early 2010s the street has undergone re-paving and other improvements.

== History ==
Newport was described in 1810 as "consisting principally of one street, built partly on the banks of the Usk" and this description is corroborated by the 1750 map of Newport. High Street led to what is now Stow Hill and eventually to the town church, St Woolos. The town once had walls, with three gates, one of which was in the centre of the High Street and was finally demolished in 1808. The High Street was widened in 1809 and, in 1810, the development of Commercial Street began, extending the town farther south.

A tax collector lived on the High Street to collect money to pay for repairs to the walls, though the Murenger's House (a 'murenger' was a tax collector) was demolished in 1816. A pub, Ye Olde Murenger House, still exists on High Street, claiming to be Newport's oldest pub, operating since 1530. It was elaborated with faux jetties at some point during the 20th century. A Post Office was built on High Street in 1844, rebuilt in 1907 and reconstructed in 2001 (according to the blue plaque on the building).

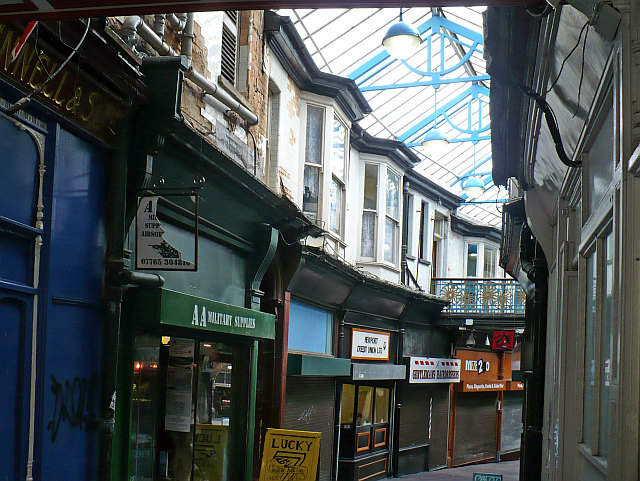
Market Arcade

A market was held in a block on the east side of the High Street from 1817. It was expanded in 1865 and, in May 1889, an even larger indoor market was opened, with a 58m central hall. The Portland stone facade of the building on High Street dates from the early 1900s. Two covered shopping arcades run off High Street, both probably by local architects Habershon & Fawckner and both now Grade II listed. Newport Arcade to the west dates from 1893 and Market Arcade, to the east, dates from circa 1900.

The High Street became a one-way system for motorised vehicles in 1949.

== 21st century ==
In the 2010s the High Street underwent regeneration and pedestrianisation as part of a wider £2.6 million project to improve the city centre shopping experience.
