= John Frost Square =

Large public area in the centre of Newport, South Wales

Coordinates: 51°35′11″N 2°59′38″W

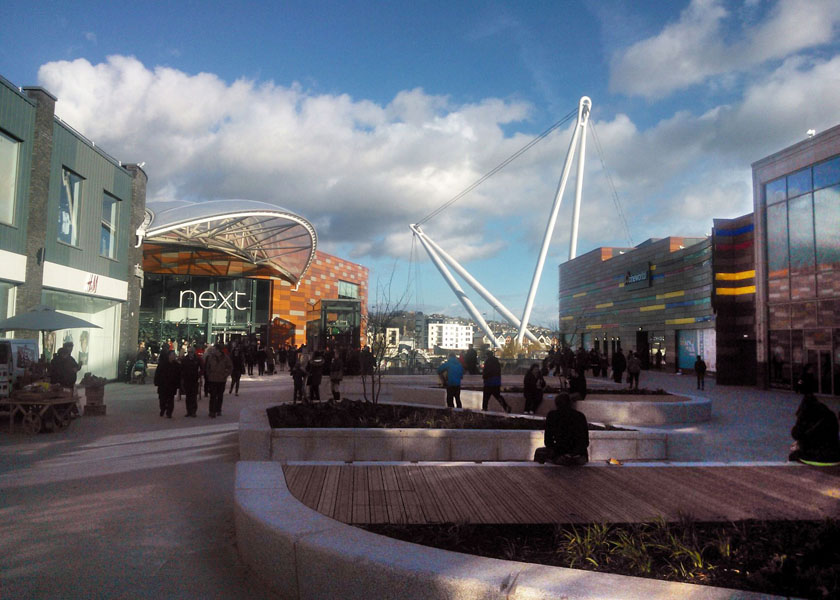
John Frost Square, 2015

John Frost Square is a large public space in the centre of Newport, South Wales, named after the Chartist leader, John Frost. It was redeveloped as part of the Friars Walk shopping and leisure complex in 2014 and 2015.

Major features on John Frost Square include the Newport Museum, Library and Art Gallery, the north entrance to Kingsway Shopping Centre and the headquarters of the Monmouthshire Building Society.

== History ==
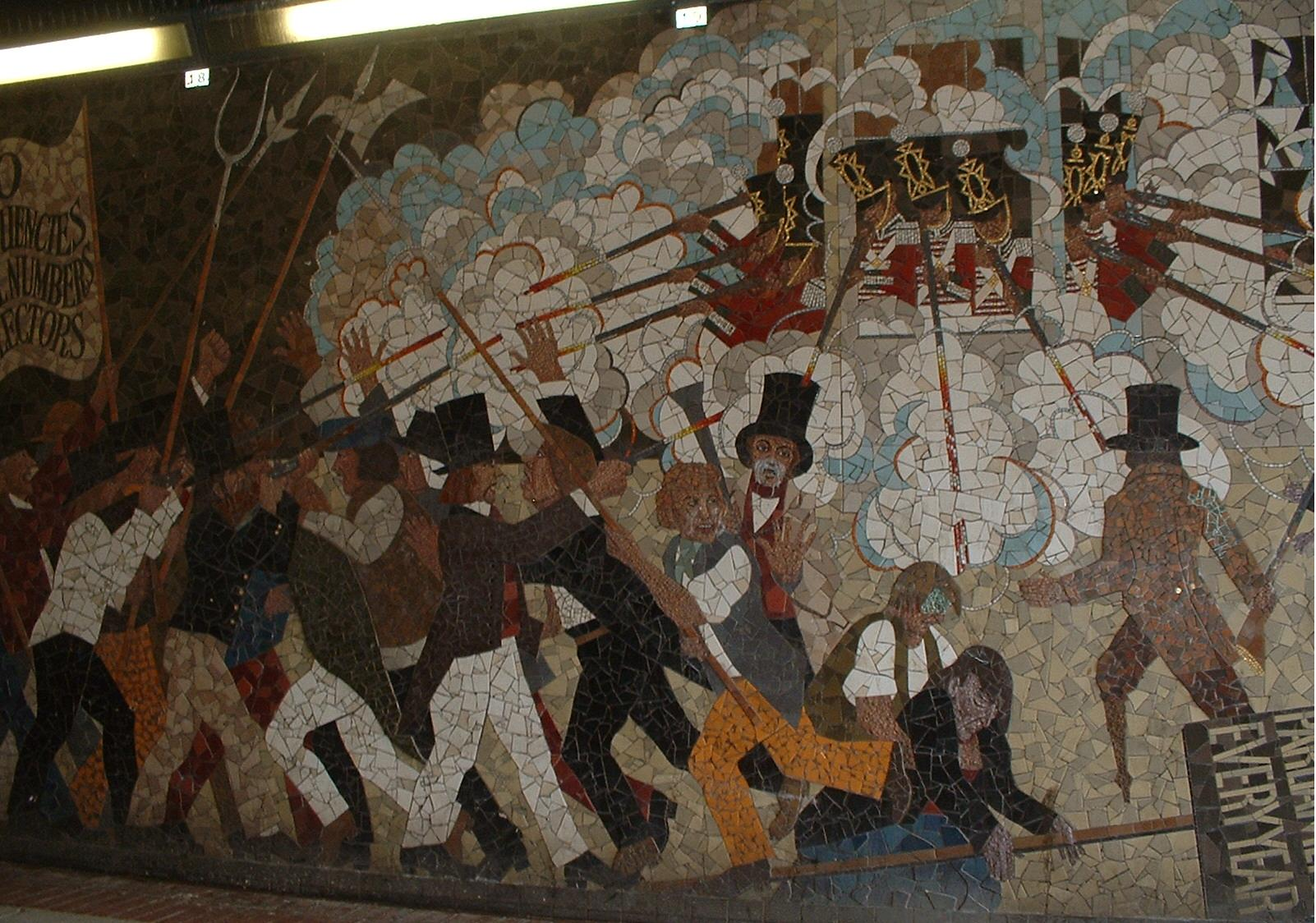
Chartist Mural

John Frost Square was completed in 1977, following 16 years of planning. In 1978 a mosaic mural by artist Kenneth Budd, commemorating the 1839 Chartist uprising, was added to the underpass in the northeast corner of the square.

=== Clock ===
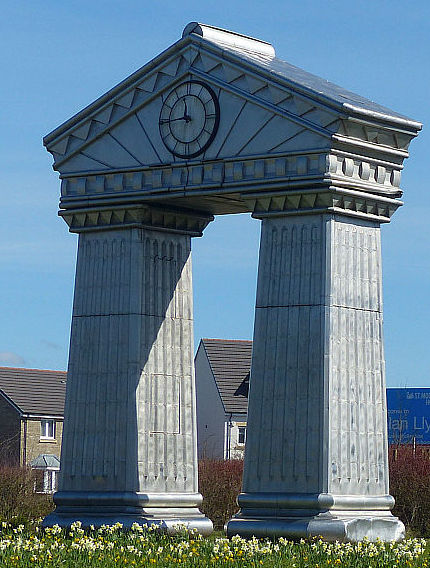
"In the Nick of Time"

Following the 1992 National Garden Festival (held in Ebbw Vale), a public clock created for the event was moved and relocated in John Frost Square. Designed by sculptor Andy Plant and called "In the Nick of Time", the clock deconstructed itself at the top of each hour as model figures paraded around it. With skeletons holding hour glasses it functioned as a modern memento mori. The Lonely Planet guide to Wales described it as "a hilarious clock tower that falls to pieces on the hour". The clock was dismantled in 2008 and put into storage, until 2011 when it was sold to local property developers for £10,000 to re-erect on a 240 hectare Glan Llyn housing development on the old Llanwern Steelworks site.

=== Demolition and redevelopment ===
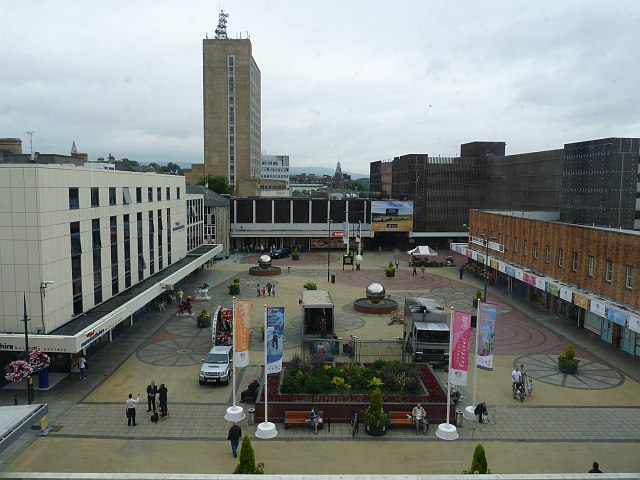
John Frost Square (2010)

The Chartist Mural was demolished by the city council, despite protests, in October 2013. Shops on the east side of the square were closed and John Frost Square was demolished in January 2014, in preparation for a £100 million refurbishment of the city centre and a new shopping and leisure complex, Friars Walk.

Friars Walk and the redesigned John Frost Square were opened to the public in November 2015. New restaurants and a Cineworld cinema face onto the square. The cinema has subsequently closed.

The stone steps leading from Kingsway to John Frost Square are inscribed with the six political reforms demanded by the Chartists.
