= Commercial Street, Newport =

Street in Newport, Wales

Coordinates: 51.585°N 2.994°W

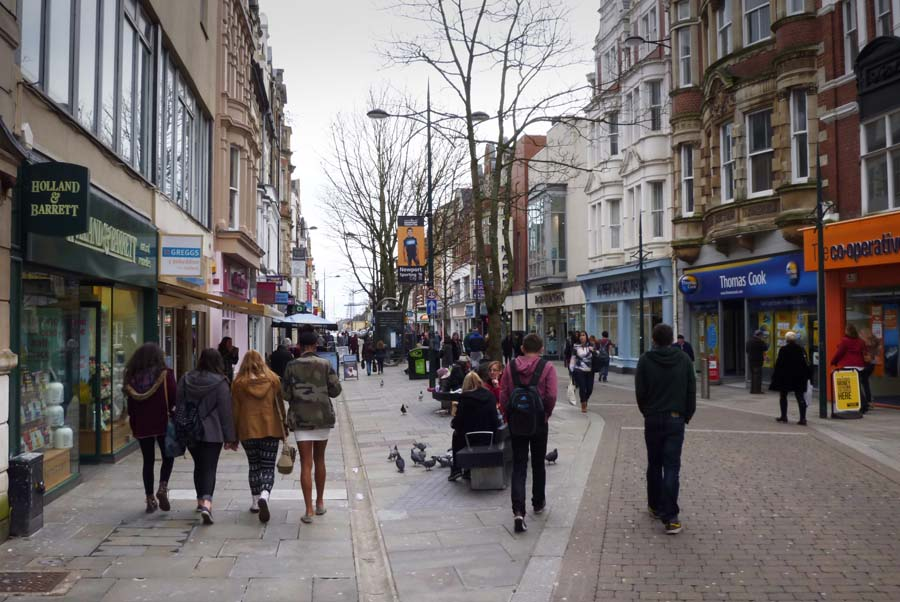
Commercial Street looking south towards the Charles Street junction (2013)

Commercial Street is a 700-yard (660-metre) long main shopping street leading from the city centre of Newport, South Wales.

== History and description ==
Commercial Street and Commercial Road were created in 1810 across open pasture land which had to be raised several feet using ship ballast so that it no longer flooded at the high Spring tides. This was part of a plan by Charles Morgan, 1st Baron Tredegar to increase Newport's importance and develop his land; in 1807 he had granted a lease on 200 acres of land to allow the Tredegar Wharf Company to create the new mile-long road. The new road led approximately south-southeast from the junction with High Street (and Westgate Hotel), linking the town centre with Pillgwenlly and the early Newport Docks.

Notable buildings on Commercial Street were the Westgate Hotel (now on what is called Westgate Square), Newport's Town Hall (1885 by T. M. Lockwood, demolished when it was replaced by the 1940 Civic Centre), the Empire Theatre (which burnt down in the 1940s), and several banks and large department stores.

== Modern day ==
The northern half of Commercial Street, from Westgate Square as far as Hill Street, is part of the Town Centre Conservation Area, including many listed buildings rising to three or four storeys, dating from the Victorian period to the early 20th century.

In the 2010s several large national stores left Commercial Street, amongst them Marks and Spencer, Burton and Monsoon leaving empty shop units, charity shops or bargain stores in their place.

Joining Commercial Street to John Frost Square is Llanarth Street, the shops on which have included shoe shop A. G. Meek, trading since 1912 and Vacara's Fish and Chip shop, which opened around 1900 and shutdown in 2025.

== Sources ==
- Newman, John (2000), The Buildings of Wales: Gwent/Monmouthshire, Penguin Books, ISBN 0-14-071053-1
