= Rogerstone =

Village and parish in Newport, Wales

Rogerstone: Welsh: Tŷ du
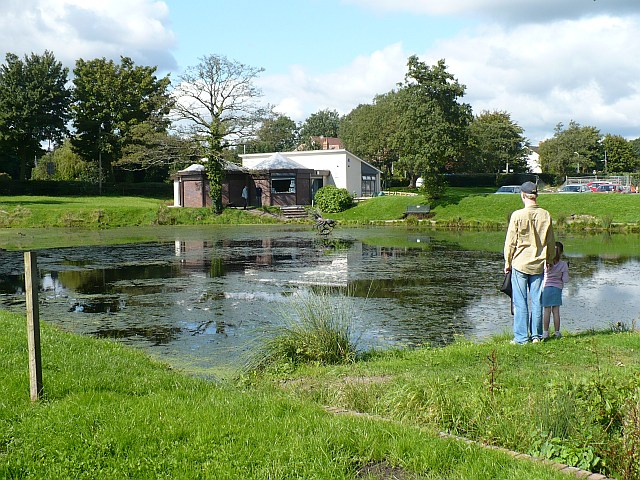
- Fourteen Locks Canal Centre

- Location within Newport
- Population: 10,158 (2011 census)
- OS grid reference: ST271885
- Principal area: Newport
- Country: Wales
- Sovereign state: United Kingdom
- Post town: NEWPORT
- Postcode district: NP10
- Dialling code: 01633
- Police: Gwent
- Fire: South Wales
- Ambulance: Welsh
- UK Parliament: Newport West and Islwyn
- Senedd Cymru – Welsh Parliament: Newport West
- List of places UK Wales Newport 51.59061°N 3.05371°W Map of the community

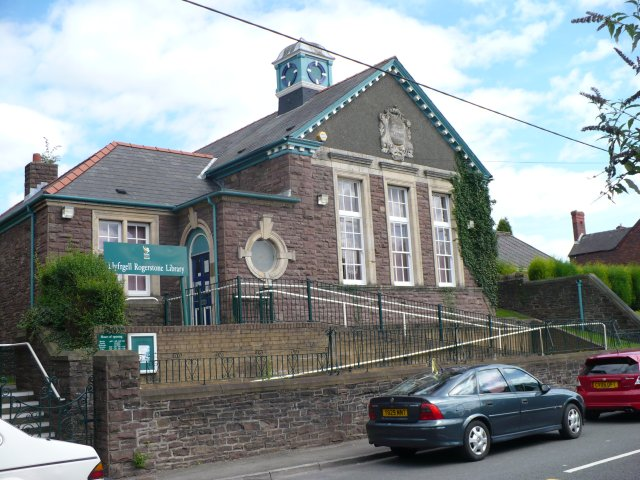
Rogerstone library

Rogerstone (Welsh: Tŷ du, meaning "Black house") is a large village and community (parish) in Newport, Wales. The area is governed by Newport City Council. The village falls within the ancient parish of Bassaleg, the historic county of Monmouthshire, and the preserved county of Gwent.

The parish lies at the gateway to the Sirhowy valley, to the north of Newport on the eastern side of the Ebbw River. It is bounded by the M4 motorway to the south, the Ebbw River to the west, the Henllys Vale to the east and the city boundary with Caerphilly county borough to the north.

Rogerstone railway station is on the Ebbw Valley Railway. It opened on 6 February 2008 and links Ebbw Vale to Cardiff Central and Newport via Rogerstone. Pye Corner railway station, to the south of the ward and on the same line, was opened on 14 December 2014.

== History ==
The original settlement dates back to Norman times when Rogerstone Castle was built in the early part of the 12th century. The name is said to originate from Roger de Haia, the Norman Lord who was responsible for the building of the castle, the remains of which are reduced to a low bush and tree covered motte adjoining the lower section of Tregwilym Road. The Welsh name for Rogerstone "Tŷ Du" translates to English as "Black House", although it is not clear why it has this name.

The larger parish of Rogerstone started as two distinct settlements of Tregwilym and Tydu, Tregwilym taking its name from the land owner, William de Berkerolle. These hamlets remained predominantly rural until the Industrial Revolution. The population increased with the growth of the tin, iron and aluminium industries which flourished near the South Wales coalfield. At one point, the village boasted the longest aluminium-rolling mill in Western Europe and one of the largest marshalling yards on the Great Western Railway network.

The village played host to John Frost and his fellow Chartists on their historic march from the valleys to Newport. The former Welsh Oak public house just north of the parish was one of the main meeting points for the protestors before they set off through the parish towards the Westgate Hotel and the events that culminated in the Newport Rising.

The parish sits astride the Crumlin branch of the Monmouthshire Canal and plays host to the Fourteen Locks. The canal opened in 1798 but was dogged by water supply problems and competition from the railways and by 1930, it had finally succumbed. It has since been restored and is a popular local attraction.

Rogerstone Library is part of Newport City Council's library service, and is officially titled Rogerstone Library and Information Centre. The building was opened in 1905 as a Carnegie Library.

Rogerstone power station was commissioned in 1958 by the Central Electricity Generating Board, after only three years' work on the site. It comprised two C. A. Parsons 60 MW turbo-alternators with a net electricity output capability of 114 MW. The Babcock & Wilcox coal-fired pulverised fuel boilers produced 138 kg/s of steam delivered to the turbines at 62.1 bar and 482 °C. Cooling for the station was by water from the River Ebbw and two reinforced concrete cooling towers, each with a capacity of 2.25 million gallons per hour (2.84 m^{3}/s). There was a single chimney. It was the first station in the UK to use aluminium cladding.

The generating capacity and electricity output from the station was as follows.

Rogerstone electricity capacity and output
Year	Capacity MW	Output GWh
1958	112	221.396
1960	120	846.663
1961	120	910.247
1962	120	840.604
1963	120	664.277
1972	126	501.896
1979	120	307.899
1981	120	211.666
1982	120	260.918

The station was decommissioned in the late 1980s, and the boiler house, cooling towers and chimney were demolished in 1991. The Afon Village housing development now occupies the site.

== Governance ==
Prior to 2022 Rogerstone was also an electoral ward, represented by three councillors on Newport City Council. Following a local government boundary review, Rogerstone was divided into three wards, namely Rogerstone East (1 councillor), Rogerstone North (1 councillor) and Rogerstone West (2 councillors).

== Modern-day Rogerstone ==
The designation of the Rogerstone section of the canal as part of the National Cycle Network (route 47) and more recent efforts to restore parts of the canal have made the site a popular tourist attraction. Funding for this work was provided by the Heritage Lottery Fund. The site houses the Fourteen Locks Canal Centre, which was the subject of an arson attack in 2011 that ruined the inside of the centre. It has now been fully refurbished and is open to the public.

The area contains a number of other popular open spaces including the Welfare Grounds and the Mescoed Mawr woodlands.

Rogerstone was traditionally an industrial, working-class village, but housing developments such as Afon Village, on the site of the former power station and Jubilee Park, on the site of the former Novelis aluminium works, have added more than 2,000 dwellings and an ever-increasing middle-class population. This has been influenced by its proximity to the M4 motorway and the Ebbw Valley Railway.

In 2005, Warburtons opened a new bakery in the village, to supply bakery products across South Wales. However, after the 2008 financial crisis, in 2010, the company announced the closure of the facility, and the loss of 140 jobs. The plant was later bought by local family owned Brace's Bakery. Brace's sold the site to another bakery David Wood Foods in 2017

The Tiny Rebel microbrewery is based in Rogerstone and opened their £2.6 million brewery and bar at the Wern Industrial Estate in 2017. Planning permission was given in 2019 for the addition of a new distribution centre at the site.

There are four primary schools within Rogerstone; Rogerstone Primary, Mount Pleasant Primary, High Cross Primary and Jubilee Park Primary. Secondary education for the area is largely provided at Bassaleg School in the neighbouring Graig ward.

In 2014, President of the United States Barack Obama and Prime Minister of the United Kingdom David Cameron visited pupils at Mount Pleasant Primary as part of the events surrounding the 2014 NATO summit at the nearby Celtic Manor Resort. To commemorate the event, one of the streets at the nearby Jubilee Park housing development was subsequently named Obama Grove.

On 4 November 2019, a smaller replica of the Chartist Mural was installed on Cefn Road, Rogerstone. The original mosaic mural was created in 1978 near John Frost Square in Newport to commemorate the Chartist rising of 1839 and demolished in October 2013. The replica was created by Oliver Budd, son of the original mural's creator, Kenneth Budd. It was unveiled exactly 180 years since the Chartist rising. The panels include an information board telling the history of Chartism.
