= The Newport Review and Monmouthshire Register =

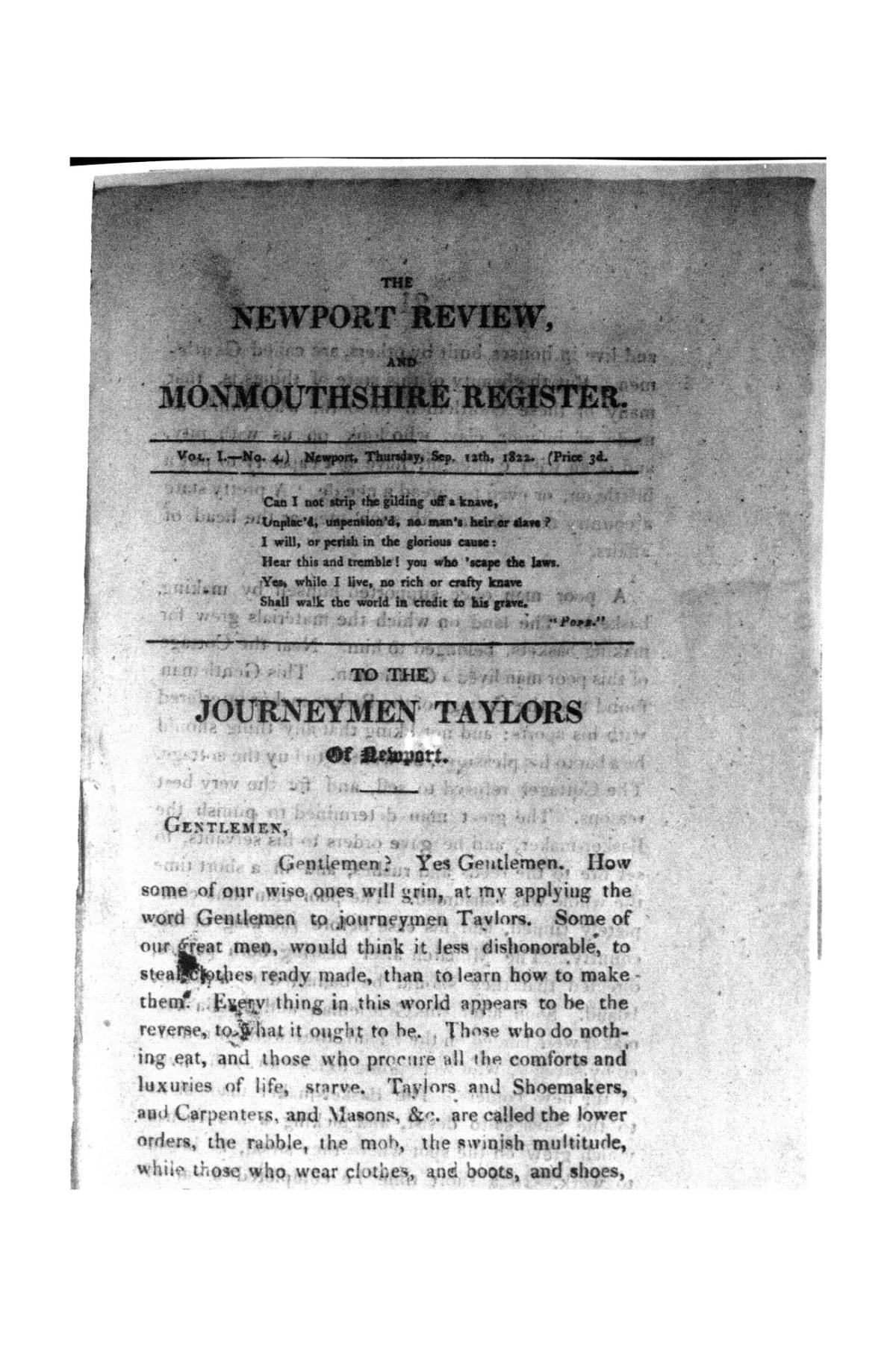
The Newport review and Monmouthshire register (Welsh Journal)

The Newport Review and Monmouthshire Register was a 19th-century Welsh periodical. It was first published by Samuel Etheridge in Newport in 1822. It contained mainly political (often radical) articles. Samuel Etheridge was the magazine's editor, and John Frost (1784–1877) (the future Chartist leader, influential in the Chartist uprising in Newport in 1839) was an early contributor. Along with John Frost's The Welchman, the radical political views shared in this periodical contributed to the tension which lead to the Newport Uprising.
