= Welsh Oak =

Welsh pub

Coordinates: 51.602200°N 3.074116°W

The Welsh Oak is a pub located in Pontymister, Caerphilly County Borough, Wales. In recent years, due to a decline in trade, the pub has ceased trading.

This was the final meeting place of John Frost, Zephaniah Williams and William Jones, all members of the Chartist movement in South Wales in the 1830s prior to and during the Newport Rising of 1839.

Each man headed up a column of men all supporting the movement of Chartism. After spending the night at the Welsh Oak the combined columns moved on to the Westgate Hotel, Newport, where they were met by soldiers and a battle ensued.

The building was damaged by a fire on 7 August 2020 but is now being restored and intended for conversion to a private dwelling.
