= John Frost School =

Location
- Lighthouse Road; Newport, NP10 8YD; United Kingdom; 51.5586°N 3.0125°W

Information
- Type: Comprehensive school
- Motto: Carpe Diem (Seize the Day)
- Established: 1959
- Local authority: Newport City Council
- Headteacher: Mark Tucker
- Age: 11 to 18
- Enrolment: 1,300 (Estyn 2020)
- Website: Official website

The John Frost School, formerly known as Duffryn High School (Welsh: Ysgol Uwchradd Dyffryn), is a comprehensive school on the south-western outskirts of Newport, south Wales. It is in the suburb of Duffryn and opened in 1959.

In 2018 the Welsh-medium secondary school Ysgol Gyfun Gwent Is Coed moved into buildings adjoining the John Frost School.

As of 2019, the head teacher is Mark Tucker.

== Name change ==
At the beginning of 2015 it was announced that Duffryn High School was changing its name to The John Frost School. John Frost (1784−1877) was a Chartist and the leader of the Newport Rising.

== In popular culture ==
In August 2019, in the BBC TV series Who Do You Think You Are?, the school was visited by TV producer Michael Whitehall and his son, actor and comedian Jack Whitehall, who were revealed to be descendants of Thomas Phillips, mayor of Newport at the time of the Rising.

In 2005, the school was used for filming the Doctor Who television episode "School Reunion". Some of the school's pupils were used as extras.
