= The Welchman =

19th-century Welsh magazine

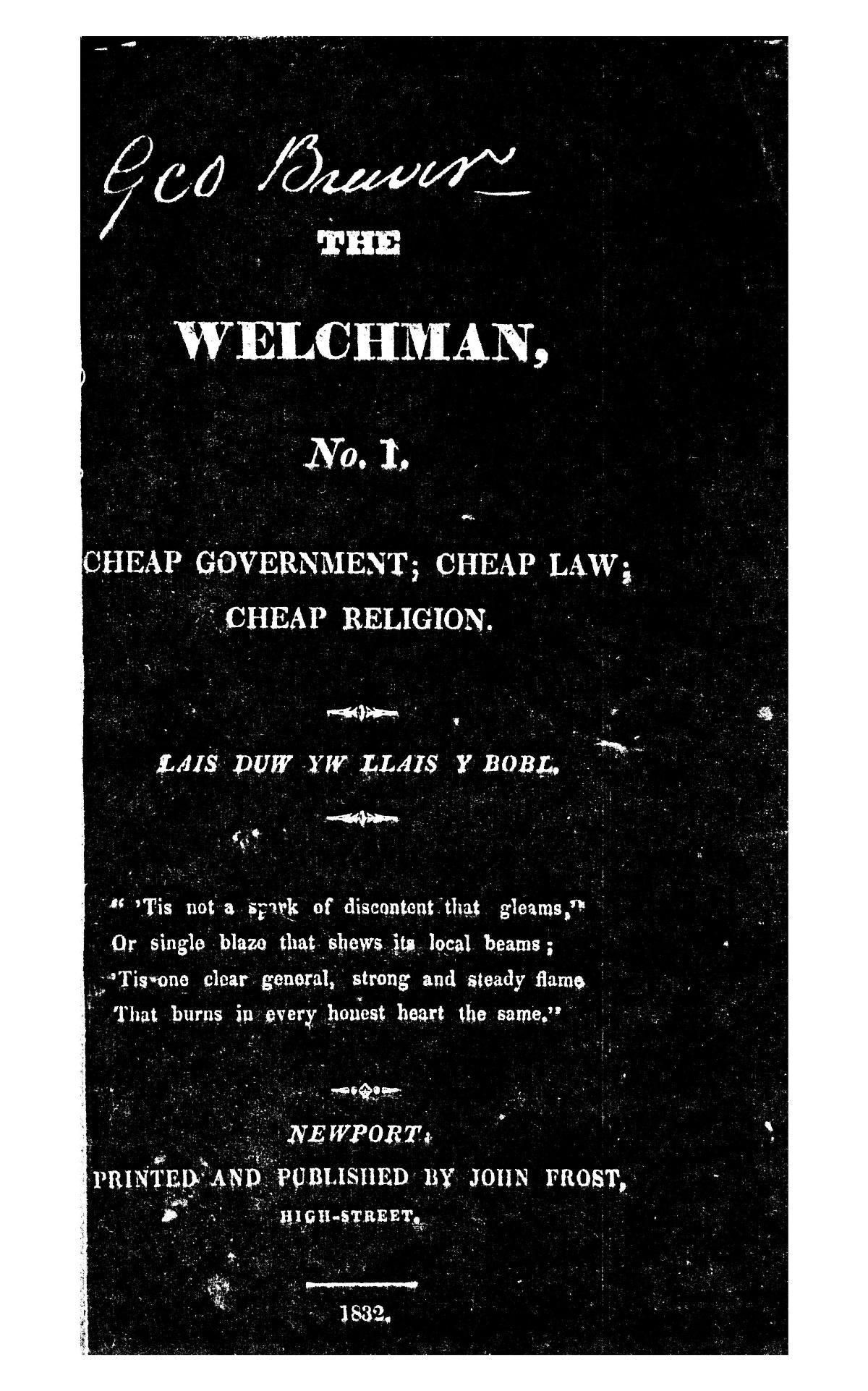
The Welchman (Welsh Journal)

The Welchman was a Welsh 19th century magazine, It was first produced by John Frost, the future Chartist leader of the Newport rising in 1832. It contained selections of politically radical articles written by John Frost. It is thought that Frost's own writing in The Welchman was largely inspired by the writings and speeches of William Cobbett.
