= Thomas Phillips (mayor) =

Welsh lawyer, politician and businessman (1801–1867)

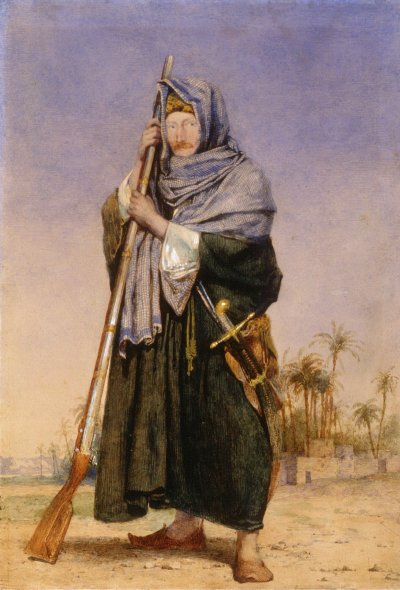
- Sir Thomas Phillips (in Arab dress), watercolour by Richard Dadd

Mayor of Newport
- In office 9 November 1838 – 1839
- Preceded by: Thomas Prosser
- Succeeded by: Thomas Dyke

Personal details
- Born: 1801 Llanelly, United Kingdom
- Died: 26 May 1867 (aged 65–66) London, United Kingdom
- Resting place: Llanellen churchyard, Abergavenny, Monmouthshire
- Occupation: Lawyer, politician and businessman
- Known for: Newport Rising

Sir Thomas Phillips (1801 – 26 May 1867) was a Welsh lawyer, politician, and businessman, who was Mayor of Newport in Monmouthshire at the time of the Newport Rising in 1839.

== Life ==
The eldest son of Thomas Phillips of Llanellen House, Abergavenny, Monmouthshire, by Ann, eldest daughter of Benjamin James of Llangattock, Crickhowell, Brecknockshire, was born at Llanelly in 1801. The family later moved to Trosnant, near Pontypool.

On 9 November 1838, Phillips was elected Mayor of Newport and became a figure of the Newport Rising. On 4 November 1839, he was in charge of the town when John Frost, at the head of 7,000 Chartists, entered it with the intention of releasing Henry Vincent from gaol. A 30-strong company of the 45th Regiment of Foot was placed at his disposal and took up station in the Westgate Inn. When the hotel was attacked, Phillips was wounded with bullets in the arm and groin. The soldiers then fired on the crowd, which was completely routed, 22 being killed and about 50 wounded.

On 9 December, Phillips was knighted to mark his "individual exertions in maintaining her majesty's authority". On 26 February 1840, he was voted the Freedom of the City of London, and admitted on 7 April. Phillips continued to warn about Chartist activity in south Wales in 1842.

Phillips was called to the bar at the Inner Temple on 10 June 1842. Shortly afterwards, he set off on a tour of parts of Europe and the Middle East. He wanted to take a draughtsman and, on the recommendation of David Roberts, employed Richard Dadd; Roberts knew Dadd's father. The journey, via Venice, Greece, and Egypt, saw Dadd suffer a breakdown, and he returned to England, leaving Phillips in Paris, in May 1843. Suffering from mental illness, Dadd subsequently stabbed his father to death and was confined to Bethlem Hospital as insane.

Phillips was named a Queen's Counsel on 17 February, and a bencher of his inn on 5 May 1865. His principal practice lay in parliamentary committees, and many lawsuits were referred to him for arbitration. In Monmouthshire, he acquired coal-mines and became a large landed proprietor in Wales.

Phillips played a major part in the success of Brecon College. He was an active member of the governing bodies of King's College London, and the Church Institution, and president of the council of the Society of Arts. In 1848 he became a member of the National Society, and devoted time and labour to the work of national education. While living simply, he gave large sums to charities. At Court-y-bella, near Newport, he built and maintained schools for the education of the colliers.

== Death and descendants ==
After addressing a committee of the House of Commons in 1867, Phillips was struck with paralysis and died five days later, on 26 May, at his London home, 77 Gloucester Place, Portman Square. He was buried in the churchyard of St Helen's church at Llanellen, Monmouthshire. He was unmarried, and his fortune was inherited by his sister's son, Thomas Phillips Price, who later became MP for North Monmouthshire between 1885 and 1895.

== Works ==
Phillips was also known as a writer on Welsh education and Welsh language, and a champion of the Welsh church, particularly in Wales, the Language, Social Condition, Moral Character, and Religious Opinions of the People, considered in their relation to Education, with some account of the provision made for education in other parts of the kingdom (1849).

This work defended the Welsh people and language against the 1847 "Blue Books" – the Reports of the Commissioners of Inquiry into the state of education in Wales. Authors Lingen, Symons and Johnson concluded from the evidence they were given in Wales that the Welsh were dirty, lazy, ignorant, superstitious, deceitful, promiscuous and immoral, and advocated eradication of the Welsh language and the encouragement of the English language. Fluent in Welsh, Phillips exposed the lies of the "Blue Books", defended the Welsh people and their language, and proposed way to improve education in Wales; a biographer described his work:

"for lucidity of treatment, for fulness of information, for calm, judicial statement, for tender yet discriminating sympathy with his poor and neglected countrymen, no less than for the suggestion of remedies applicable to their case, very few publications of the kind can be compared to this one."

He was also the author of The Life of James Davies, a Village Schoolmaster (1850; 2nd edit. 1852), a biography of James Davies (1765–1849) of Devauden.
