= 1849 Manchester Borough Council election =

Local election in Manchester

- 1 November 1849

16 of 64 seats to Manchester Borough Council 33 seats needed for a majority

Elections to Manchester Borough Council were held on Thursday, 1 November 1849. One third of the councillors seats were up for election, with each successful candidate to serve a three-year term of office.

== Ward results ==
=== All Saints' ===
All Saints'
Party	Candidate	Votes	%	±%
Conservative	Martin Middleton	uncontested		
Conservative gain from		Swing		

=== Ardwick ===
Ardwick
Party	Candidate	Votes	%	±%
Conservative	William Jones	uncontested		
Conservative gain from		Swing		

=== Cheetham ===
Cheetham
Party	Candidate	Votes	%	±%
Conservative	Thomas Sugden	206	63.0	
Liberal	Benjamin Syddall*	121	37.0	
Majority		85	26.0	
Turnout		327		
Conservative gain from Liberal		Swing		

=== Collegiate Church ===
Collegiate Church
Party	Candidate	Votes	%	±%
Liberal	Abel Heywood*	uncontested		
Liberal hold		Swing		

=== Exchange ===
Exchange
Party	Candidate	Votes	%	±%
Liberal	William Medcalf*	326	66.3	N/A
Ratepayers	William Turnbull	166	33.7	−20.9
Majority		160	32.6	
Turnout		492		
Liberal hold		Swing		

=== Medlock Street ===
Medlock Street
Party	Candidate	Votes	%	±%
Ratepayers	William Cottrell*	uncontested		
Ratepayers hold		Swing		

=== New Cross ===
New Cross
Party	Candidate	Votes	%	±%
Conservative	Joseph Lamb*	230	61.3	−17.4
	Thomas Webster	216	57.6	−21.1
Chartist	William Prowting Roberts	170	45.3	+15.9
Chartist	Thomas Peers Heywood	134	35.7	+6.3
Majority		46	12.3	−29.7
Turnout		375		
Conservative hold		Swing		
		Swing		

=== Oxford ===
Oxford
Party	Candidate	Votes	%	±%
Liberal	Joseph Adshead*	uncontested		
Liberal hold		Swing		

=== St. Ann's ===
St. Ann's
Party	Candidate	Votes	%	±%
Liberal	Samuel Phillips Hitchcock*	uncontested		
Liberal hold		Swing		

=== St. Clement's ===
St. Clement's
Party	Candidate	Votes	%	±%
	James Ainsworth	uncontested		
		Swing		

=== St. George's ===
St. George's
Party	Candidate	Votes	%	±%
	John Renshaw*	216	61.0	
	John Whitworth	138	39.0	
Majority		78	22.0	
Turnout		354		
		Swing		

=== St. James' ===
St. James'
Party	Candidate	Votes	%	±%
Liberal	William Hyde Lamb*	uncontested		
Liberal hold		Swing		

=== St. John's ===
St. John's
Party	Candidate	Votes	%	±%
Ratepayers	John Stanley	211	52.5	N/A
Conservative	Edward Royle	182	45.3	N/A
Chartist	Thomas Peers Heywood	9	2.2	N/A
Majority		29	7.2	N/A
Turnout		402		
Ratepayers gain from Conservative		Swing		

=== St. Luke's ===
St. Luke's
Party	Candidate	Votes	%	±%
	Joseph Simpson	uncontested		
		Swing		

=== St. Michael's ===
St. Michael's
Party	Candidate	Votes	%	±%
	John Boardman*	uncontested		
		Swing		
