= 1850 Manchester Borough Council election =

Local election in Manchester

- 1 November 1850

16 of 64 seats to Manchester Borough Council 33 seats needed for a majority

Elections to Manchester Borough Council were held on Friday, 1 November 1850. One third of the councillors seats were up for election, with each successful candidate to serve a three-year term of office.

== Ward results ==
=== All Saints' ===
All Saints'
Party	Candidate	Votes	%	±%
Conservative	Richard Potter	324	56.7	N/A
Liberal	Sidney Potter*	247	43.3	N/A
Majority		77	13.4	N/A
Turnout		571		
Conservative gain from Liberal		Swing		

=== Ardwick ===
Ardwick
Party	Candidate	Votes	%	±%
Liberal	William Vickers	200	51.0	N/A
Conservative	Edward Nicholson	192	49.0	N/A
Majority		8	2.0	N/A
Turnout		392		
Liberal gain from		Swing		

=== Cheetham ===
Cheetham
Party	Candidate	Votes	%	±%
	Richard Dixon	uncontested		
		Swing		

=== Collegiate Church ===
Collegiate Church
Party	Candidate	Votes	%	±%
Liberal	Miles Craston	uncontested		
Conservative	William Burton	no votes		
Liberal hold		Swing		

=== Exchange ===
Exchange
Party	Candidate	Votes	%	±%
Liberal	Ivie Mackie*	138	62.2	−4.1
Independent	William Turnbull	84	37.8	N/A
Majority		54	24.4	−8.2
Turnout		222		
Liberal hold		Swing		

=== Medlock Street ===
Medlock Street
Party	Candidate	Votes	%	±%
Ratepayers	Abraham Dearden*	290	71.1	N/A
	Thomas Evans	118	28.9	N/A
Majority		172	42.2	N/A
Turnout		408		
Ratepayers hold		Swing		

=== New Cross ===
New Cross
Party	Candidate	Votes	%	±%
Conservative	Thomas Lewis Williams*	359	72.1	−17.4
Liberal	James Scholefield*	337	67.7	N/A
Chartist	William Prowting Roberts	172	34.5	−0.8
Chartist	Thomas Peers Heywood	128	25.7	−10.0
Majority		165	33.2	
Turnout		498		
Conservative hold		Swing		
Liberal hold		Swing		

=== Oxford ===
Oxford
Party	Candidate	Votes	%	±%
Liberal	James Bake*	uncontested		
Liberal hold		Swing		

=== St. Ann's ===
St. Ann's
Party	Candidate	Votes	%	±%
Conservative	William Gibb*	169	80.9	N/A
Liberal	Henry Rawson	40	19.1	N/A
Majority		129	61.8	N/A
Turnout		209		
Conservative hold		Swing		

=== St. Clement's ===
St. Clement's
Party	Candidate	Votes	%	±%
Liberal	Robert George Stracey*	255	73.9	N/A
Temperance movement	William Howarth	90	26.1	N/A
Majority		165	47.8	N/A
Turnout		345		
Liberal hold		Swing		

=== St. George's ===
St. George's
Party	Candidate	Votes	%	±%
Conservative	John Haworth*	uncontested		
Conservative hold		Swing		

=== St. James' ===
St. James'
Party	Candidate	Votes	%	±%
Liberal	Thomas Goadsby*	83	86.5	N/A
	Isaac Chadwick	13	13.5	N/A
Majority		70	73.0	N/A
Turnout		96		
Liberal hold		Swing		

=== St. John's ===
St. John's
Party	Candidate	Votes	%	±%
Ratepayers	William Bowker*	uncontested		
Ratepayers hold		Swing		

=== St. Luke's ===
St. Luke's
Party	Candidate	Votes	%	±%
Liberal	Cornelius Randall*	117	82.4	N/A
Conservative	Matthew Curtis	25	17.6	N/A
Majority		92	64.8	N/A
Turnout		142		
Liberal hold		Swing		

=== St. Michael's ===
St. Michael's
Party	Candidate	Votes	%	±%
Conservative	Charles Ashmore*	280	82.8	N/A
Chartist	William Prowting Roberts	58	17.2	N/A
Majority		222	65.6	N/A
Turnout		338		
Conservative hold		Swing		
