= Stanley Cornwell Lewis =

British artist (1905–2009)

- Born: 18 December 1905
- Died: 9 September 2009 (aged 103)
- Awards: Member of British Empire (2006)

Stanley Cornwell Lewis MBE (18 December 1905 – 9 September 2009) was a British portrait painter and illustrator.

== Biography ==
Lewis was born in Wales and studied at the Newport School of Art in Wales from 1923 to 1926. He was then awarded a place at the Royal College of Art in London, where he studied from 1926 until 1930. In 1930 he won second prize in the Rome Scholarship Awards in Mural Painting, and later that year returned home to take up the post of Painting Master at Newport School of Art. In 1939 World War II was declared and he was called up in 1941 for initial training in North Wales and joined the Searchlight Regiment of the Gloucestershire Regiment in Somerset. After the war Stanley Lewis became Principal of Carmarthen School of Art where he taught until his retirement in 1967. Stanley Lewis, together with his wife, Minnie Lewis, were the author and illustrator of the book "Laugharne and Dylan Thomas", about their friend and neighbour, the poet Dylan Thomas. He held a three-man show at the Bruton Gallery with the sculptors Michael Ayrton and Enzo Plazzotta.

His painting The Welsh Molecatcher (1937) was voted the most popular picture at the Royal Academy Summer Exhibition that year. It hangs today at the Newport Museum and Art Gallery in Wales. His wartime painting of The Attack on the Battleship, Turpitz, is now at the Fleet Air Arm Museum at Yeovilton, Somerset.

Stanley Lewis exhibited the following pictures at Royal Academy Summer Exhibitions:

- 1932 – Portrait of Valerie, Portrait of Edith
- 1936 – Portrait of a Ploughman
- 1937 – The Welsh Mole Catcher, Portrait of Mrs Kirkley
- 1939 – Portrait of a Girl with a Rose
- 1940 – The Croesyceiliog Blacksmiths, The Doll
- 1955 – The Welsh Dresser
- 1961 – Horsepool Road, Laugharne

In the 2006 New Year Honours Lewis was awarded the MBE for services to the arts. Until his death he was working on an illustrated book of his wartime experiences.
