= Chartist Mural =

Mosaic in Newport, Wales

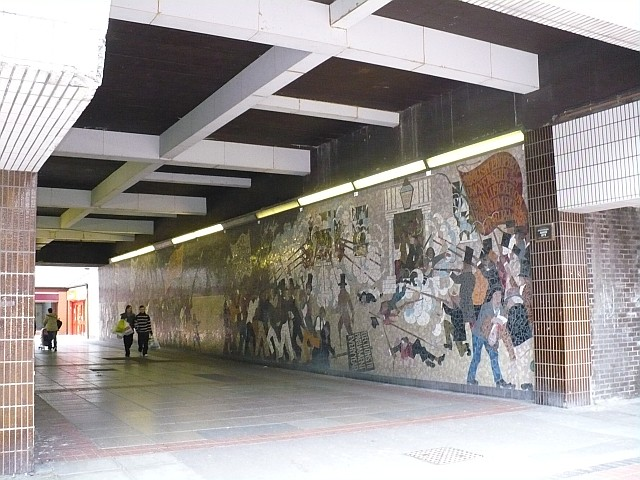
- The mural in 2008
- Artist: Kenneth Budd
- Year: 1978
- Type: Mosaic
- Dimensions: 360 cm × 3500 cm (144 in × 1344 in)
- Condition: Demolished, October 2013
- Location: Newport, Wales; 51.58689°N 2.99419°W

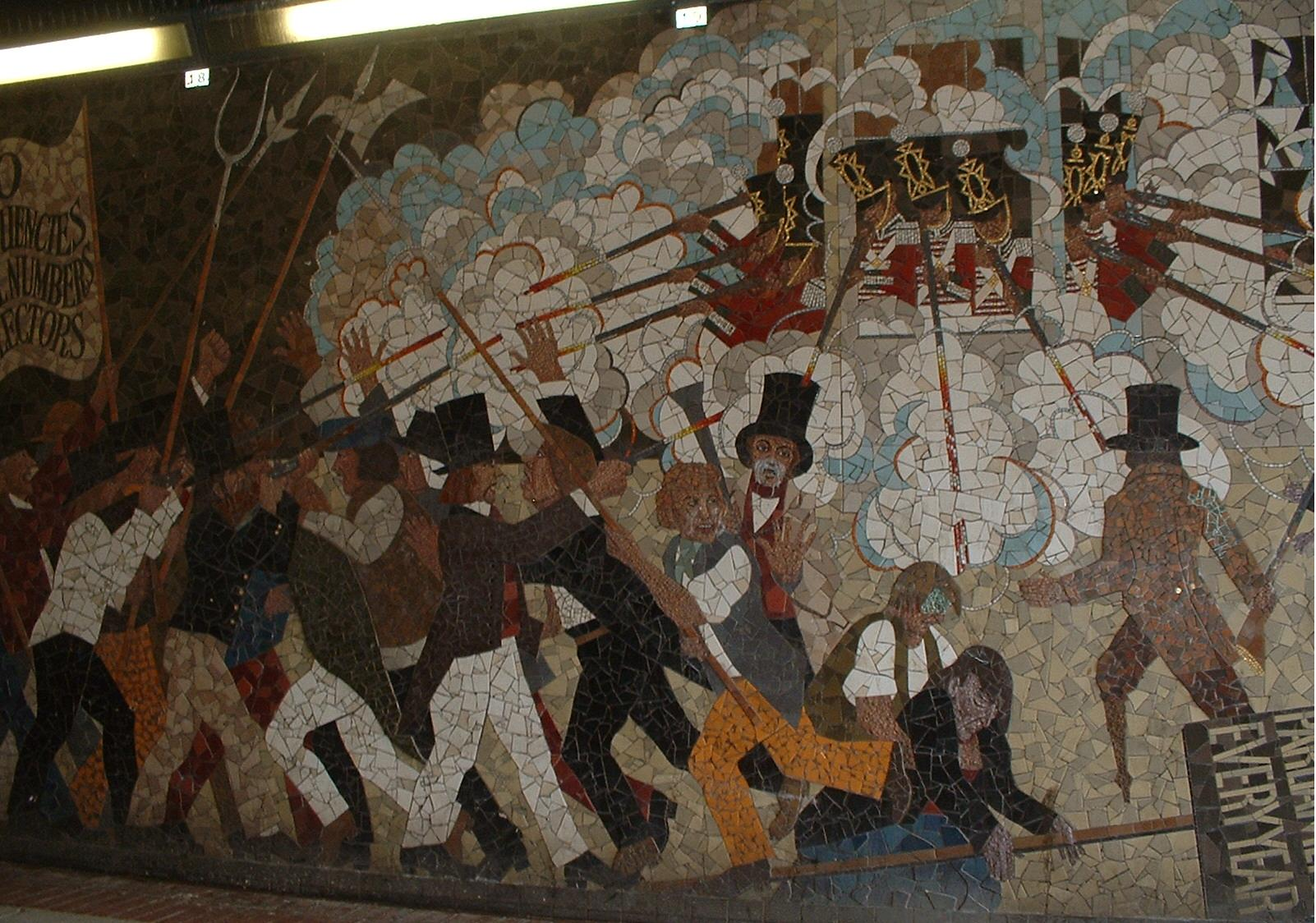
Detail from part of the mural

The Chartist Mural was a mosaic mural designed by Kenneth Budd and created in 1978 in a pedestrian underpass in Newport, Wales. It commemorated the Newport Rising of 1839, in which an estimated 22 demonstrators were killed by troops. It was 115 feet (35 m) long and 13 feet (4.0 m) high. The mural was demolished in 2013 amid considerable controversy and misinformation. The original decision to remove the artwork was taken in 2005 by the Labour-controlled Council to allow Modus development company to build the Friars Walk shopping centre. Modus were removed by the Conservative/Lib Dem coalition Council after taking control in 2008 and replaced with Queensbury Development Company Friars Walk.

== History ==
The mural comprised 200,000 pieces of tile and glass. It was designed by Kenneth Budd and erected in 1978 at an entrance to John Frost Square, which had itself been created through redevelopment and named in the 1960s. The mural celebrated the Chartist uprising of 1839, when John Frost led a march of thousands of protestors to the Westgate Hotel which was fired on by troops; some 22 demonstrators were killed.

Budd researched the Chartist rebellion for four months in consultation with experts at the Newport Museum and Art Gallery. He then created the mural in hundreds of square panels in Kent which were later assembled on site. The mural showed:

- the march of the armed Chartist insurrectionists towards Newport
- the Chartists' marching banners for the democratic demands of the Six Points of the People's Charter
- their convergence on the Westgate Hotel to protest their demands
- the final tragedy when soldiers opened fire upon the assembled Chartists.

== Destruction ==
In 2007, an introductory panel was removed, and it was proposed that the whole mural would be demolished as part of a city centre redevelopment scheme. Proposals to demolish it were restated in 2012. Alternative proposals were made that it could be recreated on ceramic tiles and displayed at Newport Central Library, or that Kenneth Budd's son Oliver could recreate a section of the mural elsewhere. Newport City Council stated that the original would be impossible to preserve and too expensive to reconstruct.

In May 2013, The Twentieth Century Society asked Cadw to list the mural as of "architectural and historical interest", but Cadw declined to do so, stating that "The quality of the building to which the mosaic is attached is poor and the underpass itself has no intrinsic design merits. It was also felt that there was no specific association between the location of the mural and the Chartist uprising." Petitions and online campaigns were made in opposition to the planned destruction of the mural, and a protest demonstration was arranged. The council stated that it had to take immediate action because of concerns over safety ahead of the demolition of the adjoining building. Contractors demolished the mural on 3 October 2013. The planned public demonstration took place on 5 October, attended by 200 people.

== Reaction ==
The demolition of the mural drew national as well as local condemnation, with Rob Williams of The Independent describing it as "indicative of the lack of regard for Welsh history and the triumph of the brute stupidity and disregard for the views of their constituents that many in authority have." A spokesman for Newport council stated that the mural "has served to remind us of Newport's past, but we must now focus on Newport's future." The council has said that it will commission "an alternative solution to commemorating the Chartist movement", in a more accessible location. Paul Flynn MP said that "a serious job has to be done to rebuild trust between the people of Newport and its council." The council's Chief Executive, Will Godfrey, apologised to councillors for not informing them in advance of when the demolition was to occur, and stated that the process "was not underhand or undemocratic as has been suggested in some parts of the media".

On 18 October Newport-born actor Michael Sheen published a full-page open letter, in local newspaper the South Wales Argus, in which he described the "irony of something that was created to celebrate those who risked much for the good of all, being wiped out without consulting the people themselves, and under the auspices of a Labour-led City Council serving the needs of profit above all else, is both absurd as well as tragic."

An editorial in the South Wales Argus on 31 October commented that "there is a lack of transparency and accountability at the top of the council that has now reached a stage where it is damaging Newport's reputation in the outside world. The timing and manner of the mural demolition was just plain stupid. It resulted in damaging publicity across the media, locally and nationally...". On 26 November, the City Council approved a motion expressing "sincere regret to residents of the city of Newport regarding the handling" of the mural's removal.

In November Michael Sheen spoke at a conference in Newport to mark the 175th anniversary of the events, and was invited by city council leader Bob Bright to chair a commission on the proposed replacement of the mural. It was announced that an independent trust would be set up, to commission a new memorial, with £50,000 of funding provided by Newport City Council. It was later clarified that Sheen would serve in an advisory capacity to the commission rather than as a member.

In March 2014, former archbishop of Canterbury Rowan Williams said that destruction of the Chartist Mural in Newport was "a sad blow for the city". Williams, who lived in Newport for almost 11 years, was one of three members of the commission established by the city council to find a replacement for the mural. He said "It did seem to be a sad blow to something of Newport's self image and self confidence.. There was a real need to gather up literally and figuratively what was left and ask the question: how can Newport now celebrate this crucial part of its history? ... The Chartist legacy is surely one of the great elements in the pride that people ought to take... I did think the destruction of the mural was a great sadness." (Note: In 2024, another mural by Budd, sited at the Old Green roundabout and depicting a florist’s stall in the nearby Newport Market, was reported as being in a poor state of repair and also facing demolition as part of a redevelopment of the area.)

== New mural ==
On 4 November 2019, exactly 180 years since the Chartist uprising, a new mural was unveiled in Newport. The new mural is a copy of the original, but smaller and in four panels. It was created by Oliver Budd, son of the original mural's creator. The panels are located on Cefn Road, Rogerstone. It also includes an information board telling the history of Chartism.
