= David Garner (artist) =

Welsh installation artist

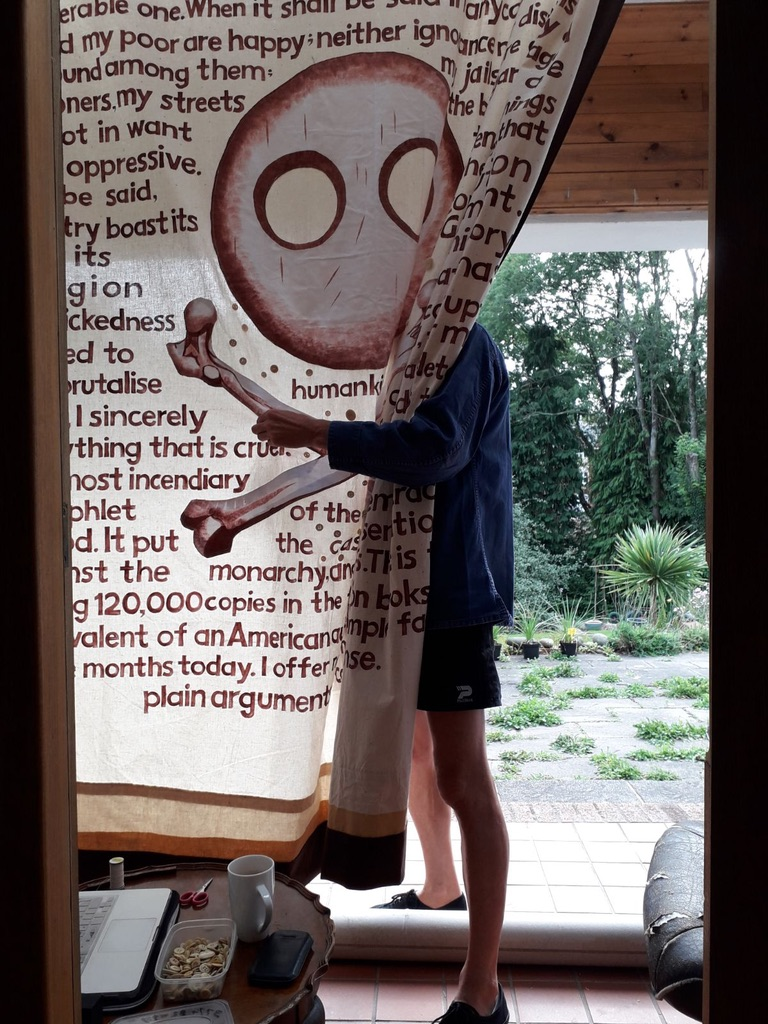
- Born: May 1958 (age 67–68); Ebbw Vale
- Education: Newport College of Art; Cardiff College of Art; Royal College of Art, London
- Known for: Sculpture, installation Art
- Awards: Ivor Davies Award, National Eisteddfod of Wales; Richard and Rosemary Wakelin Award, Glynn Vivian Art Gallery, Creative Wales Award

David Garner (born 1958 in Ebbw Vale, South Wales) is a Welsh installation artist known for his use of found objects and overtly political themes.

== Biography ==
Garner was born in Ebbw Vale, South Wales. He studied art in Newport and Cardiff, and from 1981 studied at the Royal College of Art (RCA), London. Here he received a scholarship to work in the RCA studio in Paris. Subsequently he returned to South Wales, with a desire to root his artistic practice here, now it had been transformed by the loss of the mining industry. According to curator David Briers, Garner "has an international perspective both on world affairs and on the art world. But at the same time he savours the relative isolation of his situation as a professional artist, distancing himself from the frenzied manoeuvring of metropolitan artists for short-term celebrity status."

Welsh artist Ivor Davies has described Garner as "one of the few, one of the most important artists in Britain". Garner received the "Ivor Davies Award" (from the National Eisteddfod) and his work "Politics Eclipsed by Economics" has been bought by the "Richard and Rosemary Wakelin Purchase Award".

Garner's 2013 exhibition, Shift, at Newport Art Gallery, was launched by a public demonstration against the proposed closure of the city's temporary exhibition programme. Garner created a special artwork, A Case of the Great Money Trick, which was inspired by the campaign against the gallery closure. A limited edition artist publication was also created to coincide with the exhibition which included the essay "Shifting and Shaking" by critic and writer Hugh Adams. Adams describes Garner as "a considerable narrator: his objects’ stories are tragedies – of events, situations, feelings, strivings and usually, failings... he shows society’s deliberate inhumanity, its clear, deliberate and cynical viciousness."

In 2015 the National Museum & Galleries of Wales purchased Last Punch of the Clock, for its contemporary collection. Garner became a successful recipient of the ACW Creative Wales Award, allowing him to broaden the medium in which he works, through exploring the possibilities of time-based media and their potential outcomes for his future work. As a result of this award Garner staged Call and Response, an installation comprising a chandelier at the Chartist Cave, Trefil, Mynydd Llangynidr, and an improvised response from harp player Rhodri Davies, on 20 August 2015.

Garner was included in Tomorrow Today at ‘Created by Vienna’ 2015, a city festival of contemporary art which reflected on the interface between art and capital. The eponymous essay "Tomorrow Today" by the philosopher and literary scholar Armen Avanessian focuses on artistic strategies for a post-capitalist era. Alfredo Cramerotti, Director at Mostyn curated On Being in the Middle, an exhibition at ‘Created by Vienna’ hosted by Galerie Hubert Winter and produced by Vienna City Agency.

Garner was shortlisted for Cymru yn Fenis Wales in Venice 2019 La Biennale di Venezia 58th International Art.

In 2024 Garner was invited and commissioned to take part in the exhibition, The Valleys at the National Museum and Galleries of Wales, Cardiff. As part of the commission Garner produced an audio work read by the actor Boyd Clack, Unfinished… a polemic monologue influenced by Samuel Beckett’s Waiting for Godot, together with a billboard sited near Blackwood in the Sirhowy Valley depicting a huge keep left direction arrow and an image of Anuerin Bevan wiping his eyes. Three other work were loaned by Garner to be included in the exhibition, but one was deemed to be unsuitable and censored until after the result of the General Election. The offending work is a take on an NHS hospital departmental sign but with a quote from Nye Bevan, lower than vermin, referencing the Conservative party at that time.

Garner had to wait seven weeks before the offending artwork could be displayed. He stated, ‘I never thought I would see the day that Anuerin Bevan’s words would be censored in the country of his birth.’ The Valleys exhibition proved to be one of the most successful to date and was given a three month extension due to popular demand.

In May 2025 The Turner House Gallery, Penarth exhibited Garner’s I have nothing to say, only to show, a body of new work consisting of trade union style banners, sculpture and installation. The twenty five works occupied the two floors of the gallery. To accompany the exhibition, The H'mm Foundation produced a monograph of the artist's work which was well-received.

A monograph of the same title was launched at the exhibition opening and features over fifty works with text by Sacha Craddock, Alfredo Cramerotti and Hugh Adams.

== Notable exhibitions ==
- On Being in the Middle as part of Tomorrow Today, Galerie Hubert Winter, 11 September to 7 November 2015
- Shift, Newport Art Gallery, April to June 2013
- Future Tense, Aberystwyth Arts Centre, 26 September to 10 November 2012
- Y Lle Celf, National Eisteddfod of Wales, Bala, July 2009
- Whatever They Say I Am, That's What I'm Not, Cynon Valley Museum and Gallery, Aberdare, January to March 2008
- End Product, Aberystwyth Arts Centre, City Gallery Leicester, Oriel Davies, Newtown
- Memento, G39 Cardiff, 25 September to 19 October 2002
