= Mayors in Wales =

Public office in Wales

In Wales, the office of Mayor or Lord Mayor (respectively in Welsh Maer and Arglwydd Faer) had long been ceremonial posts, with little or no duties attached to it. Traditionally mayors have been elected by community/town, borough and city councils. Since 2000, councils can decide to have directly elected mayors with extensive powers if such a proposal is approved in a local referendum.

== List of mayoralties in Wales ==
=== Lord Mayors ===
The right to appoint a Lord Mayor is less frequently bestowed than city status.

Currently, only two cities in Wales have Lord Mayors: Cardiff and Swansea.

=== Mayors ===
See also borough status in England and Wales for a list of Welsh areas having a borough charter (and therefore a mayor). County boroughs are highlighted here in bold text. Many towns have lost their borough status (for example as a consequence of the Local Government Act 1972) but continued the tradition of appointing or electing mayors to the ongoing Town Councils.

- Aberaeron
- Ammanford
- Bangor (City Council)
- Barry
- Beaumaris
- **Blaenau Gwent**
- **Bridgend County Borough**
- Builth Wells
- Caernarfon
- Cardigan
- Carmarthen
- Colwyn
- Conwy
- Cowbridge
- Crickhowell
- Cwmamman
- Dolgellau
- Glynneath
- Haverfordwest
- Hay-on-Wye
- Holyhead
- Kidwelly
- Knighton
- Llandrindod Wells
- Llandudno
- Llanelli
- Llangollen
- Llanrwst
- Llanwrtyd Wells
- Machynlleth
- **Merthyr Tydfil**
- Monmouth
- Narberth
- Neath
- **Neath Port Talbot**
- **Newport** (City Council)
- Newtown
- Pembroke
- Pembroke Dock
- Pontardawe
- Porthcawl
- Port Talbot
- Presteigne
- Rhayader
- **Rhondda Cynon Taff**
- Saundersfoot (Community Council)
- St Asaph (City Council)
- St Davids (City Council)
- Talgarth
- Tenby
- **Torfaen**
- **Vale of Glamorgan**
- Welshpool
- **Wrexham**
- Gwaun-Cae-Gurwen (Community Council)

== Mayoresses and Lady Mayoresses ==
The wife of a male Mayor is called the Mayoress and accompanies him to civic functions. A male or female Mayor may appoint a female consort, usually a fellow councillor, as Mayoress. The first female mayor in Wales, Gwenllian Morgan of Brecon elected in 1910, appointed her sister, Nellie, as mayoress. In May 2000 the mayor of Cwmamman, Howard Power, appointed his 15-year-old niece Marianne Coleman as mayoress, because his wife was too busy to fill the role. In 2008 the new Mayor of Narberth, Suzanne Radford-Smith, nominated her aunt to be Mayoress.

The consort of a Lord Mayor is the Lady Mayoress.

== See also ==
- England and Wales mayoral referendums
- Local government in Wales
- List of mayors of Cardiff
- Lord Mayors of Swansea
- Mayor of Newport
- Mayor of Wrexham
- Mayor of Carmarthen
