= Mayor of Newport =

Chief civic office of Newport, Wales

The Mayor of Newport (full style The Right Worshipful the Mayor of the City of Newport) is the civic figurehead and first citizen of the city of Newport, Wales.

The Mayor is appointed by seniority, that being the length of service on the council and irrespective of political party. The mayor holds office for one year. The mayor appointed May 2025, Councillor Kate Thomas, was the 393rd recorded Mayor of Newport. Councillor Debbie Harvey was selected for May 2026 onwards.

== Background ==
The first mayor is recorded as Ralph Dery, who took up office in 1314. The role was then left unrecorded until 1401, when Roger Thomas held office.

One of the most famous mayors of Newport was the Chartist John Frost in 1836, who less than four years later was condemned to death for treason for his involvement in the Newport Rising. Thomas Phillips was appointed mayor in 1838 and knighted for his efforts in quelling the Rising. Frost's sentence was later commuted to transportation for life to Australia. In 1856 John Frost was given a full pardon, returned to the UK and lived in Bristol.

Several mayors have, over the years, held office for more than one term. Henry John Davis was mayor from 1851 to 1852, 1891-1892 (the first of the new County Borough) and 1901–1902, having served on the Borough Council continuously for 60 years.

== Mayoral responsibilities ==
The position of Mayor of Newport is now largely ceremonial, but it still has a rôle in maintaining and promoting the interests of the city and its people. One of the responsibilities of the current post holders is to choose charitable organisations that they wish to support during their year in office.

Historically, the Local Government Act 1972 states that as chairman of the City Council, the Mayor shall have precedence in the city over all but members of the Royal Family or the Lord Lieutenant, representing the Royal Family. Subsequent legislation superseded this Act, particularly the Local Government (Wales) Act 1994.

== The Mayoral Chains of Office ==
The Coat of arms of the City forms an integral part of the Mayoral Chains, of which there are two, one for the Mayor and one for the Mayoress. The Mayor's chain consists of an original chain and detachable medallion depicting the shield surmounted by the cherub, which was the original Coat of Arms of the County Borough of Newport before the supporters were added. This original chain and medallion were presented to the Corporation for the use of Mayors of the Borough on the 9 November 1886 by Edwin James Grice, the then Mayor of Newport. Mounted on either side of the centre medallion are the medallions of the former Caerleon Urban District Council, and Magor and St Mellons Rural District Council. These two authorities were merged into Newport in 1974.

== Mayoral Car ==
The Mayor and Mayoress have use of the Mayoral Car for all official engagements. The Mayoral Car has changed over the years, but always carries the number plate NDW 1, where '"DW" are the original registration letters for Newport Corporation. NDW 1 indicates the first registration in the N series of registrations; N in this instance presumably also indicating Newport.

In 2008 the Mayoral car was a 3.2-litre automatic Jaguar XJ8. Previous cars included a stretched Ford Granada.

== List of mayors of Newport ==
The 'Newport Past' website provide a list of past mayors of Newport on their website, with records beginning in 1314.

== See also ==
Mayors in Wales
