= Church of the Holy Trinity with St Edmund =

Church in Bristol, England

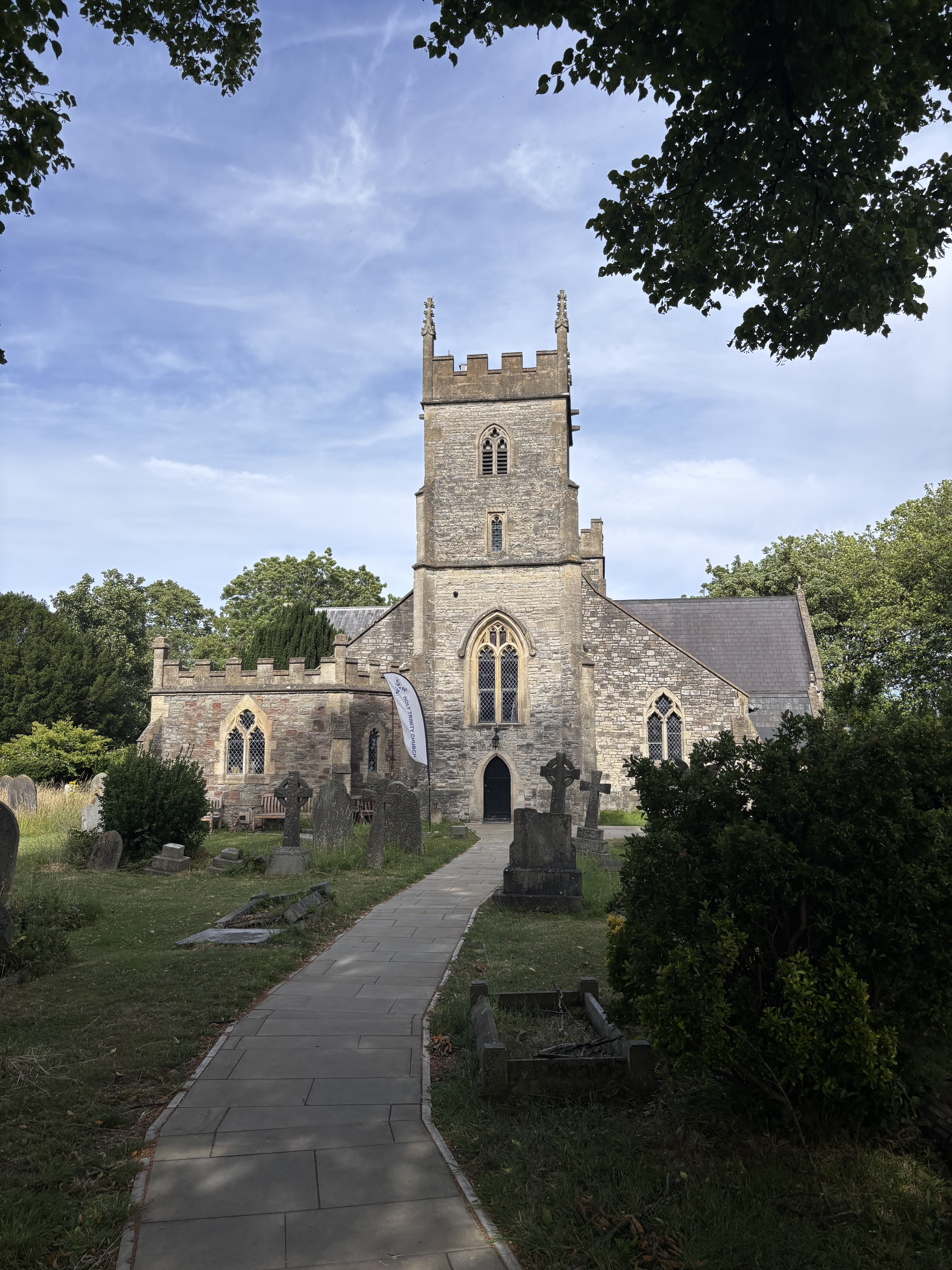
- The church in 2026

- Location within Bristol

General information
- Location: Bristol, England
- Coordinates: 51.4869°N 2.5876°W

The Anglican Church of the Holy Trinity with St Edmund is a church on Wellington Hill, Horfield in Bristol, England. It has been designated as a grade II* listed building.

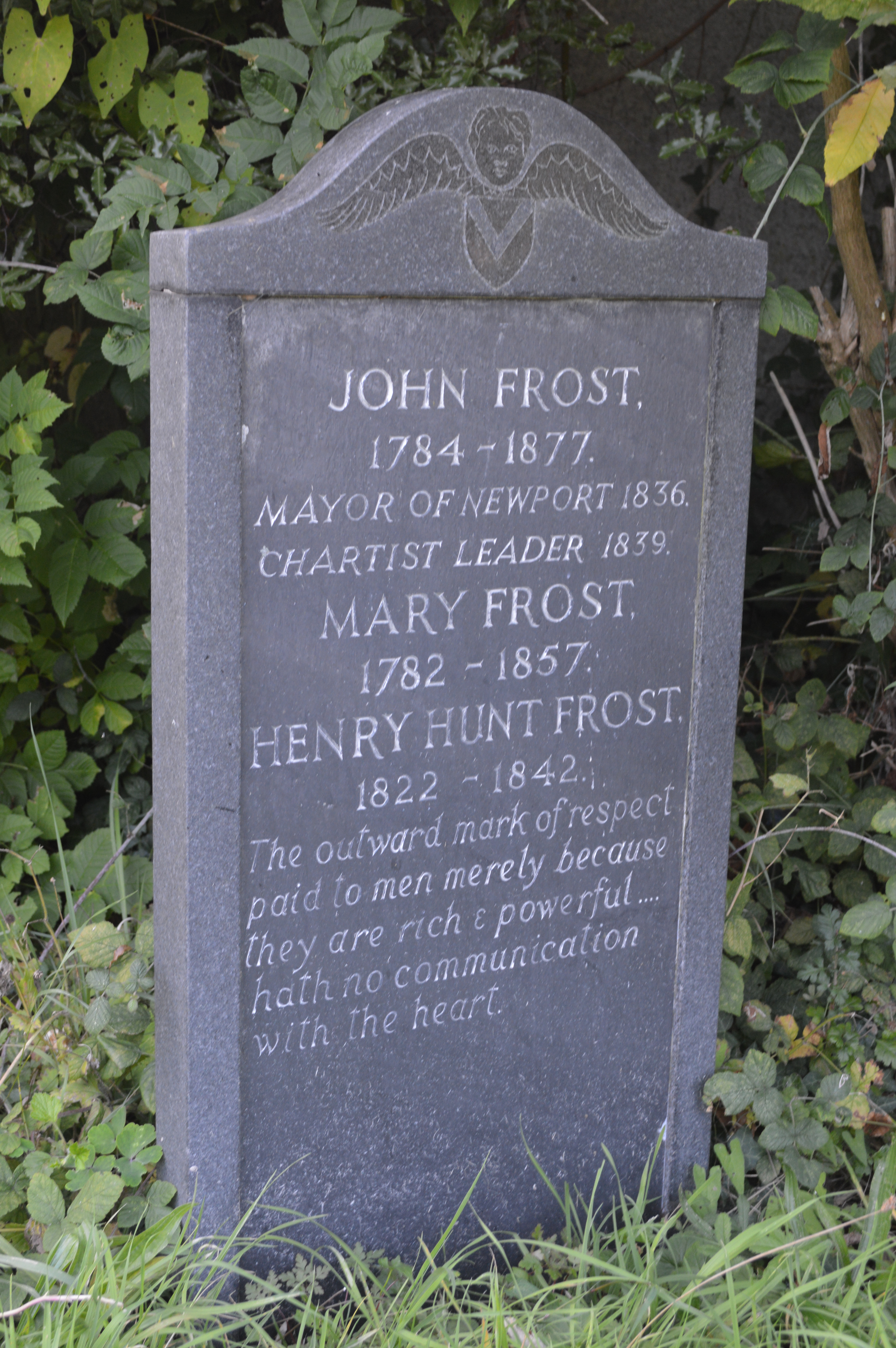
New 1980s headstone on the grave of John Frost

The west tower dates from the 15th century. It contains five bells, four of which were cast by the Bilbie family of Chew Stoke in 1773. The nave and aisles by William Butterfield date from 1847, and the chancel and crossing tower are dated 1893. The transepts were added in 1913 and 1929. The organ, which was built by Palmers of Bristol, was installed in 1885.

The church has associated with the Oxford Movement since the early 19th century. The parish and benefice fall within the Diocese of Bristol.

In 1877 the graveyard became the resting place of Newport Chartist John Frost. Although Frost's grave site was lost for many years, in the 1980s a new headstone was created and re-erected on the site, with the aid of a grant from Newport City Council. The new headstone was unveiled by Neil Kinnock.

There are also war graves of 17 British and two Canadian service personnel of World War I, and a Royal Navy sailor of World War II.

== See also ==
- Churches in Bristol
- Grade II* listed buildings in Bristol
