= William Prowting Roberts =

- Born: 11 December 1806; Chelmsford, Essex, England
- Died: 7 September 1871 (aged 64); Chorleywood, Hertfordshire, England
- Occupation: Solicitor

W. P. Roberts (11 December 1806 – 7 September 1871) was a noted Chartist who became known as the "attorney-general" of the coal miners in the 1840s.

== Family ==
William Prowting Roberts was born in Chelmsford, Essex to Rev. Thomas Roberts, who was head of the local grammar school for 40 years, and to a granddaughter of William Prowting, who was surgeon and treasurer of St Luke's Hospital for Lunatics. He married Mary Moody (d. 1837), daughter of Revd William Moody of Bathamton House, Wiltshire, and had two children, a boy and a girl. In 1839 he married Mary Hill Hopkins with whom he had two sons and two daughters.

== Chartism ==
Roberts established a legal practice in Bath, Somerset, where he became involved in local politics. He became the head of the Bath Working Men's Association. His involvement with the Chartist movement subsequently meant that he became friends with Henry Vincent. Roberts was a popular public speaker in the West Country where he also defended fellow Chartists in court. He himself was sentenced to two years of imprisonment in March 1840 after a turbulent meeting in Devizes, Wiltshire. He secured an early release in July 1840 and undeterred by imprisonment he continued his Chartist associations. He was delegate to the 1842 convention and was treasurer of the Chartist Co-operative Land Company. Roberts stood as Chartist candidate for the General Election 1847 and 1857. He arranged a speaking tour for John Frost, leader of the Newport Rising, around the United States.

== Northumberland and Durham Miners' Union ==
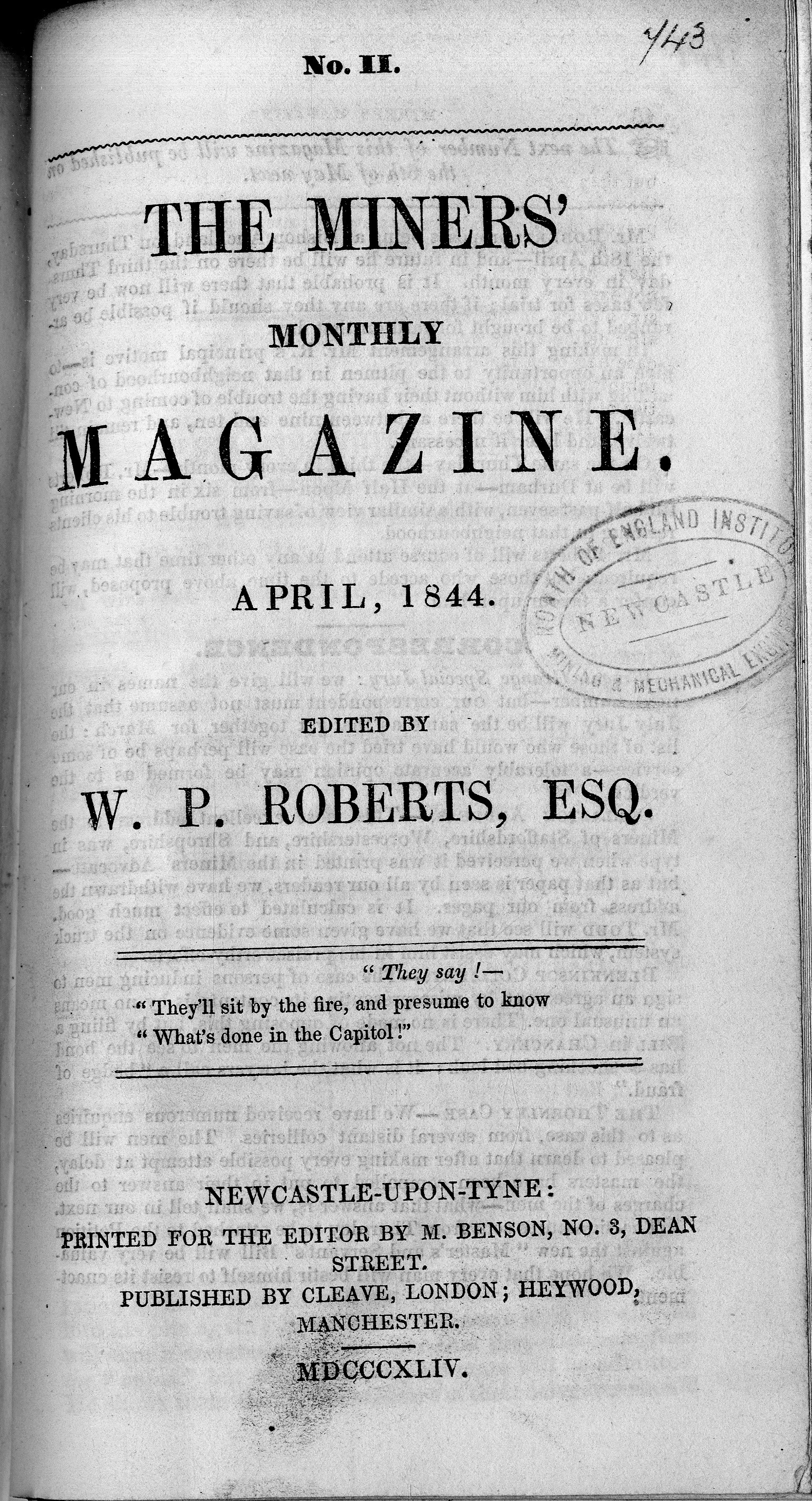
The Miners' Monthly Magazine

Being one of the first solicitors to concentrate on Trade Unions, Roberts was appointed as the legal adviser for the Northumberland and Durham Miners' Union. He became popularly known as the miners' "attorney-general". His philosophy was simple: "We resist every individual act of oppression, even in cases we were sure of losing."

Roberts challenged the Bond, the oppressive terms of employment under which the miners worked. He won many legal battles against the Bond and gained notoriety for securing the release of pitmen from Thornley, Durham colliery in 1843, who had been imprisoned for breaking the Bond. He also attacked the Truck system in which miners were paid by kind rather than cash. Friedrich Engels described this as a "Crusade against despotic Justices of Peace and truck masters". Roberts held an inquest into the Haswell colliery explosion, September 1844, in which 95 miners lost their lives. His accounts led to a government inquiry into mine safety.

During his time as a legal adviser to the mining union he edited the Miners' Monthly Magazine between March–July 1844. "In making this arrangement, Mr R's principle motive is to give an opportunity to the pitmen in that neighbourhood of consulting him without their having the trouble of coming to Newcastle." He also contributed to the union journal, the Miners' Journal which later was named the Miners' Advocate.

== Manchester ==
The coal owners severely weakened the Union after a prolonged dispute. The Union could no longer afford the services of Roberts. Roberts moved to Manchester in the summer of 1845 and became legal adviser to the Lancashire Miners' Association. He became friends and neighbours with Richard Marsden Pankhurst and later Annie Besant. He also notably fought cases involving trade unionists including the case involving engineers from Newton-le-Willows indicted for picketing. He also helped Karl Marx in his legal affairs. In 1854 he attacked the bill restricting trade on Sundays as a hypocritical encroachment on the liberties of the poor.

== Last cases ==
Roberts was the legal adviser to the Miners' National Association from 1858 to 1863 where he was forced out by the president, Alexander MacDonald as his approach was too anachronistic and out of touch. The unions did not require a lawyer that could humiliate the employers' but a someone who could use the law to settle disagreements. The also did not like Roberts interfering with internal affairs.

However, he did succeed in the case of Janet Jones of Blaenau. Janet Jones had been forced to work for two years in the colliery without payment to repay her debts incurred by their Tommy Shop when her father died. Roberts actions in court led to her getting her wages and started a large campaign against the Truck system.

In October 1867 he acted for the Fenians who were tried for the murder of a policeman, he was taken into custody after the judge, Colin Blackburn, ordered that his conduct in court was unorderly. In December of the same year he secured the release of Ann Justice who was among the six Irish who were charged for the Clerkenwell explosion. Roberts helped the Irish in the battle against Irish-English racism.

His last notable case was in 1869 involving the miners at Monkwearmouth Colliery where he finally managed to abolish the Bill. In 1871 he published a pamphlet highlighting the dangers of the government's Trade Union Bill.

== Later life ==
Dedicating himself to the poor, Roberts realised that it was impossible for most of the poor to live out proper Christian lives. He visited the Holy Land with his wife in 1862 and again in 1863 and lectured at Church of England societies. They moved to Heronsgate House in 1867 which was an old school built on O'Connorsville which was the first Chartist land settlement at Chorleywood, Hertfordshire. Roberts died there on 7 September 1871 and is buried in Chorleywood churchyard.

== Sources and further reading ==
- "W.P.Roberts" Looking At History: Chartist Lives
- North of England Institute of Mining and Mechanical Engineers: The Miners' Monthly Magazine, April 1844: Tracts Vol.28
- Durham Mining Museum Morpeth Herald: 11 June 1859; page 5; column 2:
- The History of the Wiltshire Constabulary 1839–2003 by Paul Sample; page 6; Riots and Rebellion:
