= William Jones (Chartist) =

Political radical and Chartist

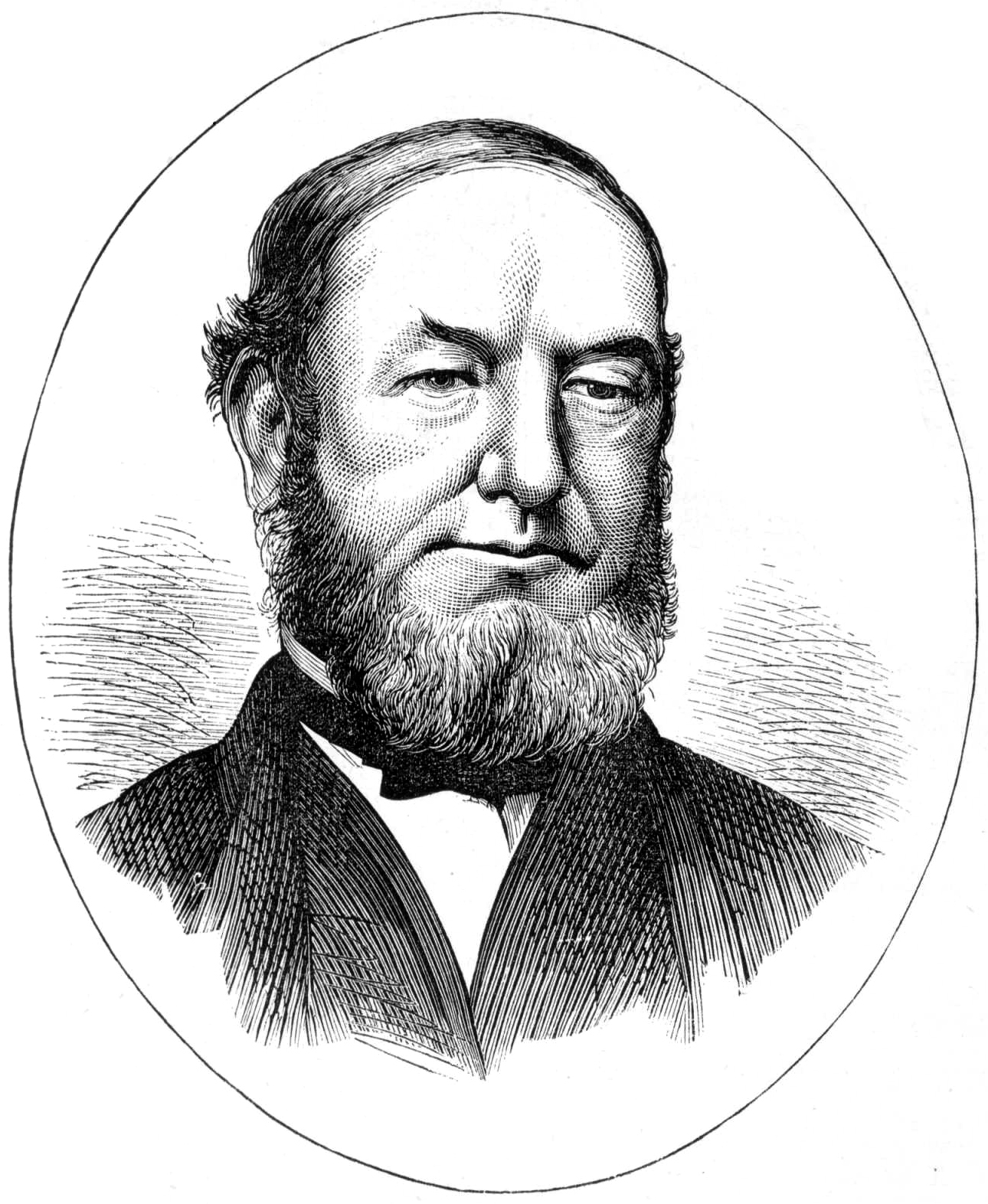
- 1874 engraving
- Born: William Jones; 1809
- Died: 20 February 1873 (aged 64); Launceston, Tasmania, Australia
- Occupations: Actor; Watchmaker
- Criminal charge: High Treason
- Criminal penalty: Death, commuted to Transportation
- Criminal status: Full Pardon granted 1856

William Jones (1809–1873) was a political Radical and Chartist, who was a former actor, working as a watchmaker at Pontypool in Monmouthshire and also kept a beer house.

He was prosecuted for his part in the Chartist Newport Rising at Newport, Monmouthshire on 4 November 1839.

Along with John Frost and Zephaniah Williams, he was appointed a leader of a column of men in what is sometimes regarded as the greatest armed rebellion in 19th-century Britain.

Jones was supposed to be bringing men to Newport from the Pontypool area and the eastern valleys of Monmouthshire on the night of the rising, but they never arrived, delaying the main body of Chartists final march into Newport into the daylight hours and thus partly contributing to its defeat.

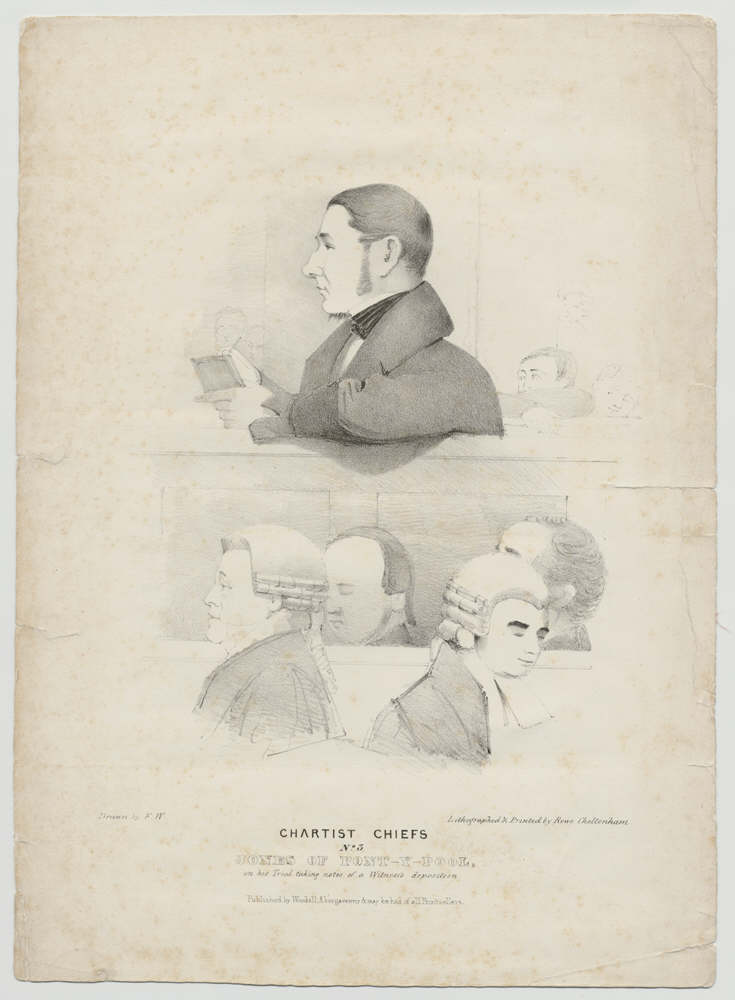
Jones on trial

He was captured a few days after the rising. He was imprisoned in Monmouth County Gaol and placed on trial at the Shire Hall in Monmouth. He was sentenced to death for High Treason, but his sentence was commuted and he was sentenced to penal transportation to Australia for life.

== Exile in Australia ==
While in exile, members of the Chartist movement continued to advocate for the repatriation of the leaders of the Newport Rising. In March 1847, the House of Commons debated a proposal for their repatriation, but it was defeated by 196 votes to 31 (including the vote of Disraeli). The convicts won partial pardon in 1854 and total pardon in 1856. John Frost returned to England. Jones decided to remain behind in Australia and stuck by his watchmakers's trade. He died in poverty in 1873.

== See also ==
- List of convicts transported to Australia
