= Newport Museum =

Museum in Newport, Wales

Newport Museum and Art Gallery
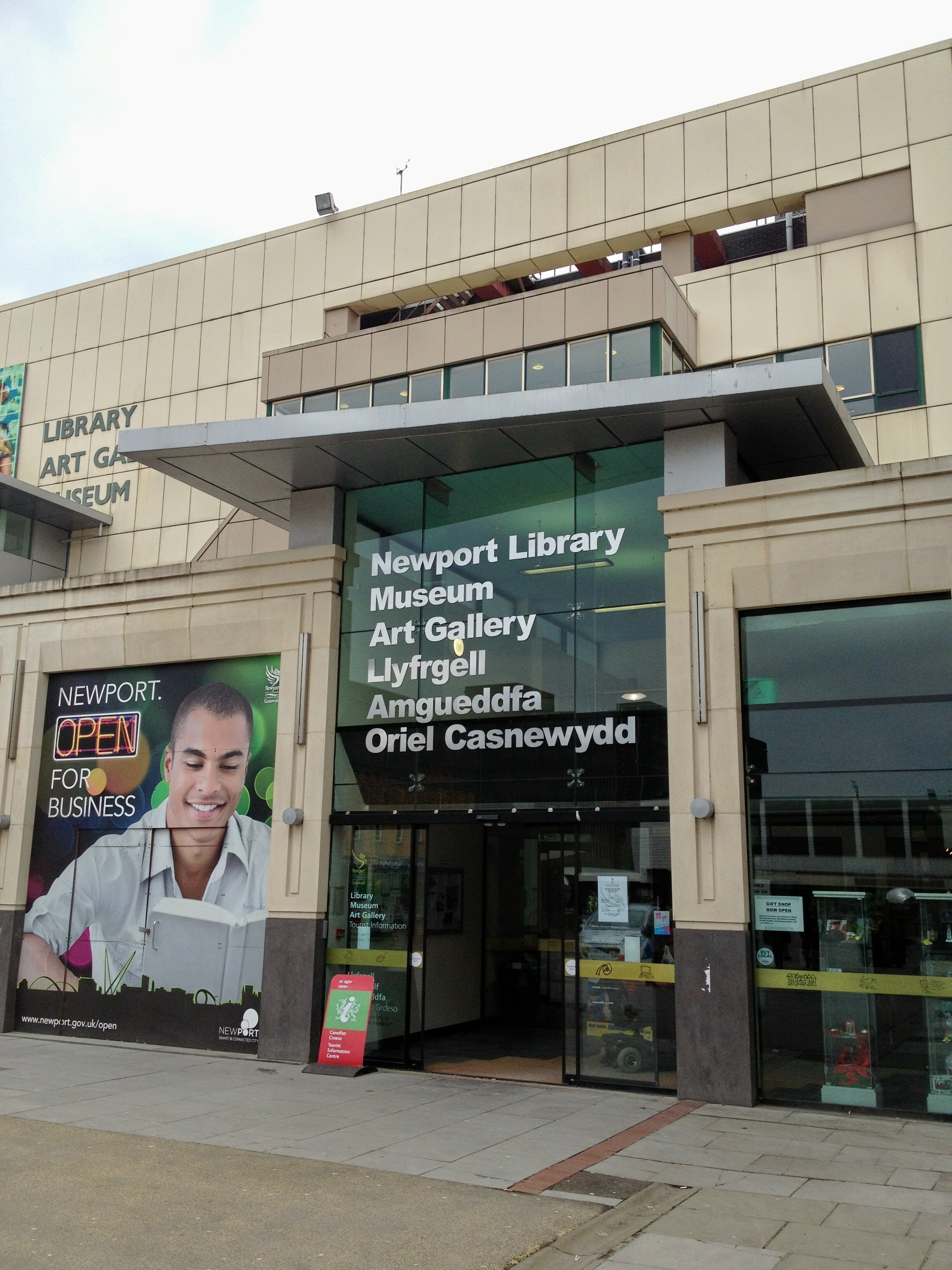

- Museum location in Newport, Wales
- Established: 1888
- Location: Newport, Wales
- Coordinates: 51.5858°N 2.9935°W
- Type: Local history and art
- Website: http://www.newport.gov.uk/heritage/Museum--Art-Gallery/Museum-Art-Gallery.aspx

Newport Museum and Art Gallery (Welsh: Amgueddfa ac Oriel Gelf Casnewydd) (known locally as the City Museum (Welsh: Amgueddfa Dinas)) is a museum, library and art gallery in the city of Newport, South Wales. It is located in Newport city centre on John Frost Square and is adjoined to the Kingsway Shopping Centre.

== The collections ==
Newport Museum opened in 1888 in Dock Street and moved to its current purpose-built building in 1968. The collections include Archaeology, Social History, Art and Natural History. The most ancient artefacts in the museum are tools made by hunter-gatherers who walked the shores of the Severn estuary hundreds of thousands of years ago. The Roman collections rank amongst the best in Wales, comprising material excavated from the Roman town of Caerwent and the fortress at Caerleon. The Medieval and later collections feature finds from local castles and priories, including an outstanding assemblage from Penhow Castle.

The most significant items of Social History are the Chartist collection of weapons, broadsheets, prints and silver from the 1839 Chartist uprising in Newport and the Transporter Bridge archive, which includes all of the original designs for the bridge and photographs of its construction.

The Fine Arts collections includes paintings by Sir Stanley Spencer, Dame Laura Knight and L S Lowry, and Welsh artists such as Kyffin Williams, Ceri Richards and Stanley Lewis. The Decorative Art collections feature the John Wait teapot collection and the Iris Fox collection of porcelain and Wemyss ware and sculpture by Sir Jacob Epstein and studio ceramics by Lucy Rie and Ewen Henderson.

== Art gallery ==
As well as a museum, the building is home to Newport's principal art gallery. The gallery hosts a wide variety of British paintings, watercolours and contemporary artworks. The largest collection is known as the John & Elizabeth Wait Collection.

Past exhibitions at the gallery have attracted controversy. In 2008 a painting of a naked woman smoking was removed from display after a complaint from a bishop. When it was put back, 20,000 people queued to see it. In October 2011 the council apologised for The Institute of Mental Health is Burning exhibition, where explicit sex scenes were put on display (and published in a free supplement) without any warning notices.

In 2013 the temporary exhibitions programme was threatened with closure after Arts Council funding was withdrawn. Welsh actor Michael Sheen spoke out against the closure threat. The post of Visual Arts Officer was to be scrapped (after more than 25 years) and the temporary shows replaced with a static exhibition from the permanent art collection.

Possibly the final temporary exhibition, Shift, by Welsh artist David Garner was launched in April 2013 following a public demonstration against the proposed closure. Garner created a special artwork, A Case of the Great Money Trick, which was inspired by the campaign to keep the gallery open. The temporary exhibition programme closed after the conclusion of Shift.

== Newport Central Library ==
The museum building is also home to the city's public Central Library. It has a large collection of books and articles and is the headquarters of Newport's library network which includes Maindee and Caerleon libraries.

In March 2012 it was reported that the Chartist Mural by Kenneth Budd in John Frost Square was to be recreated in Newport Central Library as part of the redevelopment of the area. The mural was demolished in 2013 and discussion on a replacement memorial is ongoing.

== See also ==
- Venta Silurum
