= Kenneth Budd =

English mural artist (1925–1995)

Kenneth George Budd
- Born: 16 October 1925; Fulham, London, England
- Died: 21 January 1995 (aged 69)
- Education: Beckenham School of Art; Royal College of Art
- Occupation: Mural artist
- Spouse: June Budd
- Children: 3

Kenneth George Budd (16 October 1925 – 21 January 1995) was an English mural artist, known for his mosaics and work in other materials. His company, Kenneth Budd and Associates was based in Penge, south London.

Budd was born in Fulham, London, and studied at Beckenham School of Art from 1941 to 1944, then at the Royal College of Art from 1947 to 1950. He first worked for the firm of William Mitchell & Partners of Forest Hill, London which produced public art in concrete.

He was made an Associate of the Royal College of Art in 1950. Budd was elected the Master of the Art Workers' Guild in 1992.

== Oliver Budd ==
Later in his career, Budd worked with his son Oliver, who continues to make murals and has redone some of his father's work. In January 2015 Oliver Budd appeared in Episode 2 of the BBC mini-series Sacred Wonders of Britain discussing the Roman mosaics of Lullingstone Roman Villa.

== Works ==
Budd's works include:

Work	Location	Date	Picture	Coordinates (With links to map and aerial photo sources)	Notes
Kettering Abstract	Tresham Institute (formerly Kettering Boys' School), Kettering	1962			Removed for safekeeping by Kettering Civic Society. The mosaic has been recreated in the Alfred East Gallery in Kettering but the gallery is closed to the public during renovations.
Civil War mural	Colmore Circus, Birmingham	1964		52.48300°N 1.89634°W (approx.)	Mosaic depicting the English Civil War; destroyed.
Horsefair 1908	Holloway Head, Birmingham	1967		52.47478°N 1.90070°W	Mosaic mural The animals on plinths are part of a separate, later, artwork.
Old Square	Old Square, Birmingham, Birmingham	1967	Old Square	52.48231°N 1.89500°W	Fibreglass mural. Commissioned by the Public Works Department of Birmingham City Council. Unveiled on 21 April 1967 by Alderman C.V. Simpson, chairman of the Public Works Department. Depicts the history of the square.
J. F. Kennedy Memorial	Deritend, Birmingham	1968		52.474950°N 1.886312°W	Mosaic mural; destroyed 2007; recreated by Oliver Budd from original drawings, 2012 Image shows the near complete recreation, on 15 January 2013
History of Snow Hill	Snow Hill, Birmingham	1968		52.48523°N 1.89934°W	Mosaic mural depicting Snow Hill railway station; destroyed 2007. A miniature version has been created nearby.
Old Green Murals	Old Green Interchange, Newport, Gwent	1971		51.59026°N 2.99497°W	Mosaic mural completed 1975
Chartist Mural	John Frost Square, Newport, Gwent	1978		51.58689°N 2.99419°W	Mosaic mural; destroyed 3 October 2013; a recreation was considered. Image shows a section of the work.
Industrial mural	Colmore Circus, Birmingham				Destroyed
Coat of arms	Foyer, Guy's Tower, Guy's Hospital, London			51.50444°N 0.08667°W (approx.)	Mosaic mural
Local Life 1890–1910	underpass under A467, Abertillery, Gwent			51.73011°N 3.13759°W	Commissioned by Gwent County Council
