= John Frost (Chartist) =

British Chartist

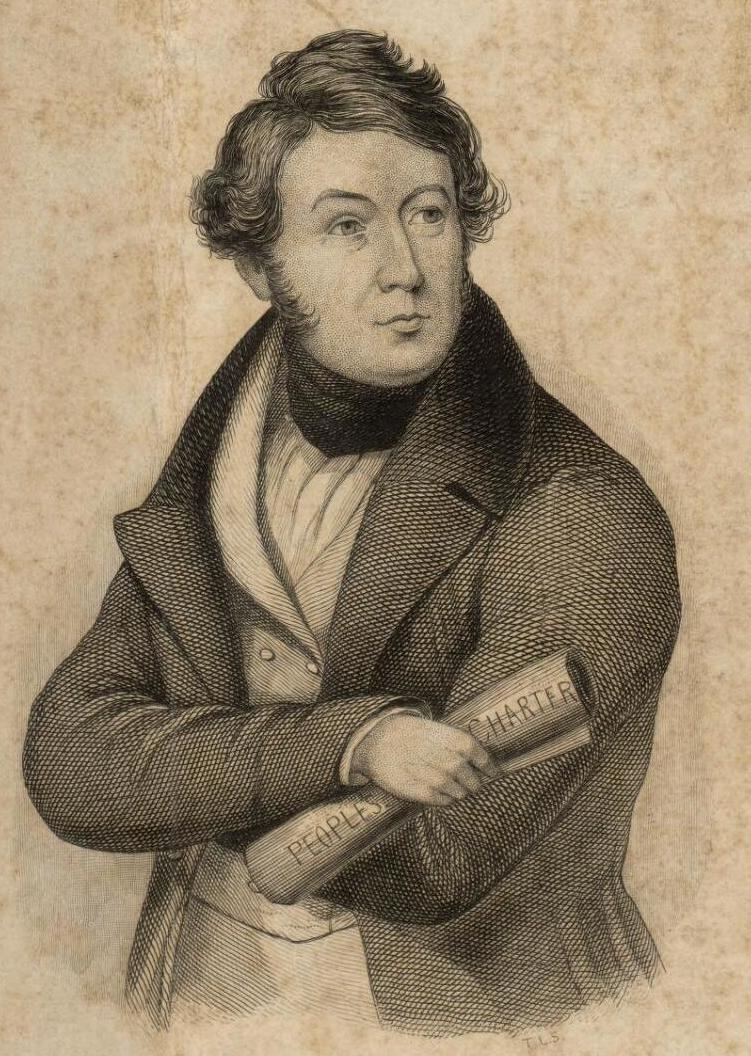
- Born: 25 May 1784; Newport, Monmouthshire, Wales
- Died: 27 July 1877 (aged 93); Stapleton, Bristol, England
- Resting place: Church of the Holy Trinity with St Edmund, Horfield, Bristol
- Monuments: John Frost Square, Newport
- Occupation: Tailor
- Known for: Chartism
- Criminal charge: High treason
- Criminal penalty: To be hanged, drawn and quartered; commuted to transportation for life
- Criminal status: Unconditional pardon
- Spouse: Mary Geach

John Frost (25 May 1784 – 27 July 1877) was a prominent leader of the British Chartist movement in the Newport Rising.

== Early life ==
John Frost was born in Newport, Monmouthshire, where his father, also named John, kept the "Royal Oak Inn", in Thomas Street (a blue plaque honouring Frost's birthplace is located on the side of the old Post Office in the High Street, marking the approximate street location). John was mainly brought up as an orphan by his grandfather, a bootmaker. He was apprenticed to a woollen draper in Bristol and was later a shopman in London. Frost's political affiliations were greatly influenced by Thomas Paine and William Cobbett. John and Sarah Frost worshipped at Hope Baptist Chapel, situated behind the present day Commercial Street and Skinner Street and their eight children were all baptised there.

Frost's mother Sarah died early in his childhood and he was brought up by his grandparents. He was apprenticed as a bootmaker to his grandfather and left home at the age of sixteen to become a draper's apprentice and tailor, first in Cardiff, then Bristol and later London. He returned to Newport in 1806 to start his own business, which became prosperous. He married a widow Mary Geach in 1812 and over the course of eleven years they had eight children. He was held in great esteem and affection for his appealing character and was commended for being "studious, quiet and obedient."

== Political career ==
In 1821, Frost became embroiled in a dispute with a Newport solicitor, Thomas Prothero, who was also Town Clerk, over his uncle's will. In a letter Frost accused Prothero of being responsible for the former's exclusion from the will. Prothero sued for libel and Frost was ordered to pay £1,000. Frost then accused Prothero of malpractice. Again, Prothero sued for libel and again won. In February 1823, Frost was imprisoned for six months and told in no uncertain terms that further accusations against Prothero would lead to a longer sentence.

After his release Frost turned his anger against Prothero's friends and business partners, notably Sir Charles Morgan of Tredegar House and Park, a major Newport and south Wales landowner and industrialist. In a pamphlet of 1830, he accused Morgan of mistreating his many tenants and advocated electoral reform as a means of bringing Morgan and others like him to account. An appreciation both of Frost's literary skill and his mounting exasperation can be gained from his letters, to Sir Charles Morgan himself amongst others. In the early 1830s Frost increasingly became a champion of universal suffrage.

Establishing himself as a prominent Chartist, he was elected in 1835 as a town councillor for Newport and appointed as a magistrate. He also became an Improvement Commissioner and Poor Law Guardian and the following year became Mayor of Newport. His aggressive behaviour and election as a delegate to the Chartist Convention in 1838 antagonised his old enemies. He was defeated in the mayoral election the following year and the Home Secretary also revoked his appointment as magistrate.

== Letter to Lord John Russell ==
Because of his continuing role within the Chartist Movement, Home Secretary Russell dismissed Frost from his position as justice of the peace. In response, while at a Chartist Convention in Pontypool, Frost responded to Russell in a straightforward letter, containing the contemporary Chartist songs of Wales, which gave expression to the feelings and determination of the Welsh coal miners:

Uphold those bold Comrades, who suffer for you,
Who nobly stand foremost, demanding your due,
Away with the timid –'tis treason to fear–
To surrender or falter, when danger is near,
For now that our leaders disdain to betray
'Tis base to desert them, or succour delay

'Tis time that the victims of labour and care
Should for reap what is labour's fair share
'Tis time that these voice in the councils be heard
The rather than pay for the law of the sword;
All power is ours, with a will of our own
We conquer, united – divided we groan.

Come hail brothers, hail the shrill sound of the horn
For ages deep wrongs have been hopelessly borne
Despair shall no longer our spirits dismay
Nor wither the arms when upraised for the fray;
The conflict for freedom is gathering nigh:
We live to secure it, or gloriously die.

Nonetheless, while the desire amongst the Welsh to rebel was ever stronger, Frost himself still wished to postpone the date of an uprising. By the end of October, the Welsh Chartists were holding daily meetings in Monmouthshire in an attempt to force an armed rebellion. Records suggest that ultimately, finding himself unable to postpone the date of an organised uprising any longer and still doubting its success, Frost burst into tears. A thirty-member conference ultimately fixed the date for 3 November.

== The Newport Rising ==
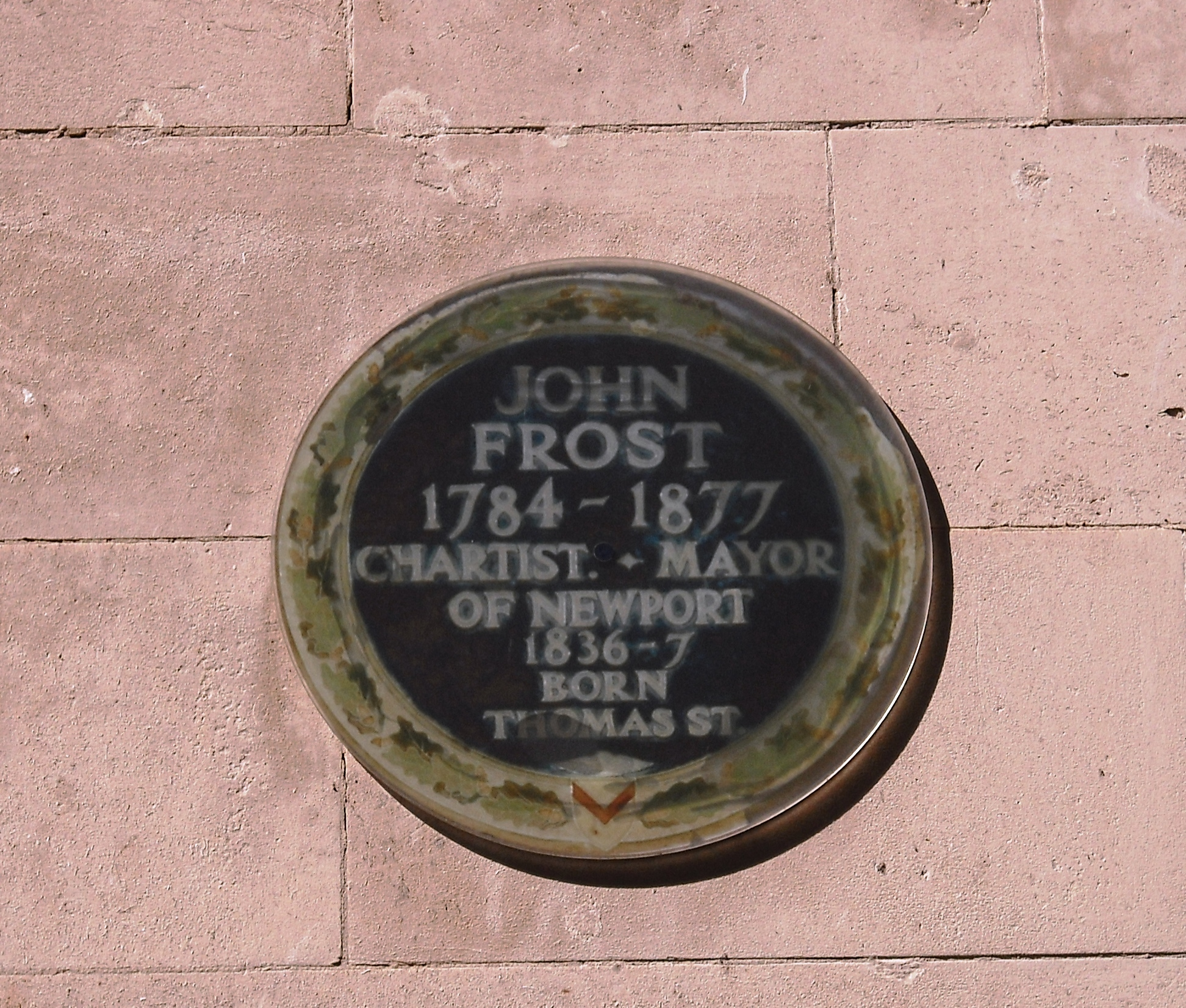
John Frost commemorative plaque, High Street, Newport

On 3–4 November 1839 John Frost, together with William Jones and Zephaniah Williams, led a Chartist march on the Westgate Inn in Newport. The rationale for the set piece confrontation remains opaque, although it may have its origins in Frost's ambivalence towards the more violent attitudes of some of the Chartists, and the personal animus he bore towards some of the Newport establishment who were ensconced in the hotel along with 60 armed soldiers. The Chartist movement in south east Wales was chaotic in this period, after the arrest of Henry Vincent, a leading agitator, who was imprisoned nearby in Monmouth gaol and the feelings of the workers were running extremely high, too high for Frost to reason with and control. One of his contemporaries, William Price described Frost's stance at the time of the Newport Rising as being akin to "putting a sword in my hand and a rope around my neck."

The march, which had been gathering momentum over the course of the whole weekend as Frost and his associates led the protestors down from the valley towns above Newport, numbered some 3,000 when it entered the town. According to the plan, three columns from three directions were to march upon Newport and take the town before dawn. The contingent starting from Blackwood was commanded by Frost, the detachment coming from Nantyglo by Williams and the main body of Pontypool by Jones. The three columns were to meet at Risca, but this did not come to pass; owing to a storm raging in the night, all of them arrived late, and the worst trouble was that the delay gave the Newport authorities ample time to get wind of what was afoot and make ready to confront the coming armed Chartists. Special constables were sworn in hastily, the known Chartists of Newport were arrested and shut up in the Westgate Hotel where the mayor held 30 soldiers in reserve. The Chartist troops led by Frost, proceeding to the hotel at 9:30 am and demanding the surrender of the Chartist prisoners with armed menace, advanced to the door. When the soldiers posted in the hotel started firing, ten to fifteen Chartists died instantly, about 50 were wounded. The bloody event was over in 20 minutes. The Chartist miners were in a very bad strategic position, and the firing took them by surprise. When they withdrew, they met the contingent of Williams and outside the town, the column of Jones. The Times estimated that the strength of the Chartists contingent at 8,000 whilst the chartist Robert Gammage estimated 20,000.

Overall the battle of the Westgate lasted only about 25 minutes, but at its close some 22 people lay dead or dying and upwards of 50 had been injured. An eyewitness report spoke of one man, wounded with gunshot, lying on the ground, pleading for help until he died an hour later.

== Reprisal by the local council ==
The reprisal by the local council followed immediately. The three commanders and 150 Chartists were arrested in a short time. The rumour spread that the Chartists insurgents intended to take Cardiff on 5 November. The Cardiff magistrates were seized with panic: in addition to mobilising the special constables they built up serious military defences and the crew of an American vessel lying at anchor in the port were also brought to the aid of the authorities. After Newport, however the Welsh Valleys were wrapped in quiet, and even the English manufacturing districts were paralysed for a short while.

== Trial and sentencing ==
Dramatisation of the trial of the Chartists at Shire Hall, Monmouth, including background information

A reward of £100 was offered for Frost's capture and he was arrested by solicitor and clerk Thomas Jones Phillips (an ancestor of Jack Whitehall and Michael Whitehall) and charged with high treason. Early in 1840, along with Jones and Williams, was tried at Monmouth's Shire Hall. All three were found guilty and became the last men in Britain to be sentenced to be hanged, drawn and quartered. The Chartists stood up as one man for the Newport leaders under sentences of death. O'Connor, O'Brien, Harney Taylor and other Chartists leaders free on bail rose to speak on their behalf. O'Connor offered one week's income of the Northern Star for a Frost fund and retained one of the best lawyers of the time, Sir Frederick Pollock as defence counsel. Following a huge public outcry, however, these sentences were discussed by the Cabinet and on 1 February the Prime Minister, Lord Melbourne, announced that the executions would be commuted to transportation for life.

On reaching Van Diemen's Land (modern Tasmania), Frost was immediately sentenced to two years' hard labour for making a disparaging remark about Lord John Russell, the Colonial Secretary. Frost was indentured to a local storekeeper in New Town after his probation term ended in November 1843. He spent three years working as a clerk, before being sent to Bothwell in May 1846 and receiving his ticket of leave in November 1846. He worked as a school teacher in various locations around Tasmania for almost eight years until he received a conditional pardon on 27 Jun 1854.

Chartists in Britain continued to campaign for the release of Frost. Thomas Duncombe pleaded Frost's case in the House of Commons but his attempt to secure a pardon in 1846 was unsuccessful. Duncombe refused to be defeated and in 1854 he persuaded the Prime Minister, Lord Aberdeen, to grant Frost a pardon on the condition that he never returned to Britain. Frost sailed for the United States six months after receiving his conditional pardon, with his daughter, Catherine, who had joined him in Tasmania, and toured the country, organised by William Prowting Roberts, lecturing on the supposed unfairness of the British system of government.

== Later life ==
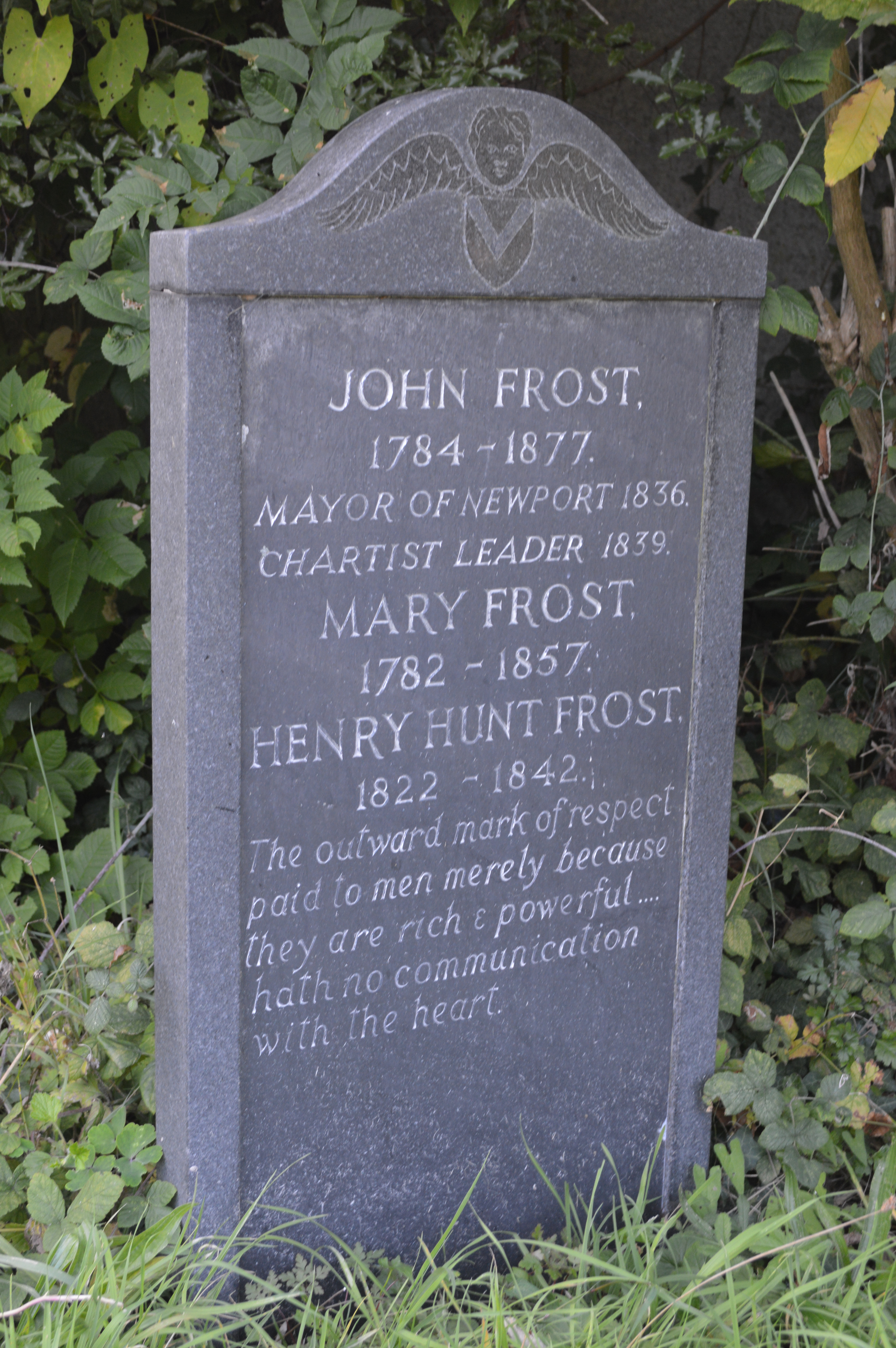
New 1980s headstone on John Frost's grave

In 1856, when the residency condition was lifted, Frost was given an unconditional pardon and he straightaway sailed for Bristol, arriving on 12 July. He retired to Stapleton, near the city, but continued to publish articles advocating reform until his death there, aged 93, in 1877.

Frost was buried in the churchyard of the Church of the Holy Trinity with St Edmund, Horfield, Bristol in accordance with his will. In the 1980s Richard Frame found Frost's lost grave site and organised for a new headstone to be created and erected on the site, with the aid of a grant from Newport council. The new headstone was unveiled by Labour Party leader Neil Kinnock.

A plaque has been added to the wall of The Mynde in Caerleon reading:

In the last quarter of the twentieth century we have taken the Right to Vote for granted. This was not always so, and in 1839 after the failure of petitioning the Government of the day, the men of Britain and South Wales sought to change the system through marches and demonstration – this was known as the Chartist Uprising. John Jenkins the owner of Mynde House and Master of the Ponthir Tin Plate Works, concerned for his property, constructed the Mynde Wall in order to keep marauding demonstrators out. The wall in front of you is what remains of his efforts.

John Frost Square, in Newport city centre, was named in his honour. A 1978 mural of the Newport Rising by Kenneth Budd in the square was demolished in 2013. A trust is to be set up to commission a new memorial with £50,000 of funding provided by Newport City Council. A planning application was approved on 3 Apr 2019 to set up a quarter-scale replica of the Newport Rising mural in Rogerstone, three miles from the city centre. Kenneth Budd's son Oliver has been commissioned to make it using the original drawings from 1978. In 1991, three statues by Christopher Kelly commemorating the Chartist Newport Rising entitled Union, Prudence, Energy were installed outside the Westgate Hotel in Newport.

== See also ==
- John Frost School
- List of convicts transported to Australia
