= Newport Rising =

1839 pro-democracy revolt by Chartists in Newport, Wales

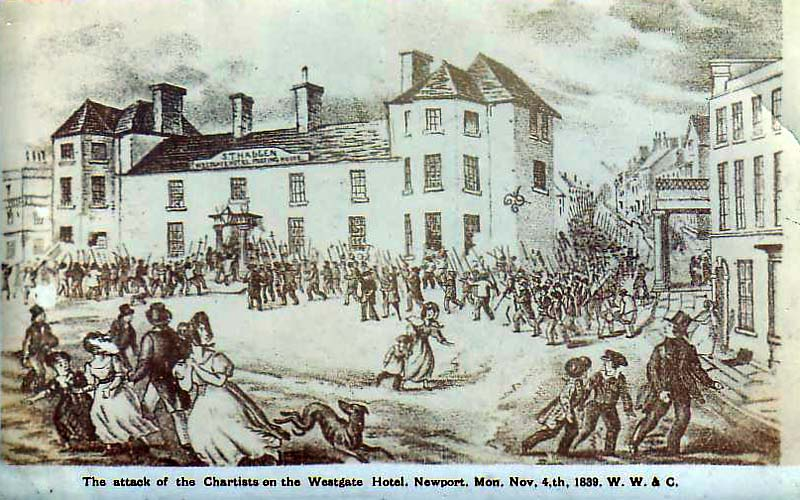
- The attack of the Chartists on the Westgate Hotel
Date	4 November 1839
Location	Newport, Monmouthshire, Wales
Result	Rising defeated; Rising leaders arrested

Belligerents
Chartists	Newport council; Newport Borough Police; British Army

Commanders and leaders
John Frost; Zephaniah Williams; William Jones	Thomas Phillips (WIA)

Units involved
	45th Regiment of Foot

Strength
1,000–5,000	60 soldiers 500 special constables

Casualties and losses
10–24 dead 50+ wounded	4 wounded

The Newport Rising was the last large-scale armed rising in Wales, by Chartists whose demands included democracy and the right to vote with a secret ballot.

On Monday 4 November 1839, approximately 4,000 Chartist sympathisers, under the leadership of John Frost, marched on the town of Newport, Monmouthshire. En route, some Newport chartists were arrested by police and held prisoner at the Westgate Hotel in central Newport. Chartists from industrial towns outside of Newport, including many coal-miners, some with home-made arms, were intent on liberating their fellow Chartists. Fighting began, and soldiers of the 45th Regiment of Foot, deployed in the protection of the police, were ordered to open fire. Between 10 and 24 Chartists were confirmed killed, whilst reports of perhaps a further 50 injured. Four soldiers were reported as injured, as well as the mayor of Newport who was within the hotel. Subsequently, the leaders of the rising were convicted of treason and were sentenced to be hanged, drawn and quartered. The sentences were later commuted to transportation.

== Causes ==
The origins of Chartism in Wales can be traced to the foundation, in the autumn of 1836, of the Carmarthen Working Men's Association.

Among the factors that precipitated the rising were the House of Commons' rejection of the first Chartist petition for democracy, in the People's Charter of 1838 (which called for universal suffrage, secret ballot, a salary for MPs, giving those who did not own property the right to vote, etc.) on 12 July 1839, and the conviction of the Chartist Henry Vincent for unlawful assembly and conspiracy on 2 August.

Some kind of rising had been in preparation for a few months and the march had been gathering momentum over the course of the whole weekend, as John Frost and his associates led their followers down from the industrialised valley towns to the north of Newport. Some of the miners who joined the rising had armed themselves with home-made pikes, bludgeons and firearms.

A column was headed by Frost who led it into Newport from the west, Zephaniah Williams led a column from Blackwood to the northwest and William Jones led a column from Pontypool to the north.

The exact rationale for the confrontation remains opaque, although it may have its origins in Frost's ambivalence towards the more violent attitudes of some Chartists, and the personal animus he bore towards some of the Newport establishment. The Chartist movement in southeast Wales was chaotic in this period and the feelings of the workers were running extremely high.

== Events leading up to the Rising ==
Heavy rainfall delayed the Chartists and there were delays in the planned meeting of each contingent at the Welsh Oak in Rogerstone. Jones and his men from Pontypool in fact never arrived, delaying the final march into Newport into the daylight hours, which might have prevented further deaths at the hands of the soldiers. As the columns progressed down the valleys on the Sunday morning, even one entire chapel congregation willingly joined, swelling the ranks of the Chartists.

After spending Sunday night mostly out of doors in the rain, the commitment of many of the Chartists was tested. Many had allegedly been ambivalent to the Chartist cause in the first place, more concerned with the immediate problems of their own employment conditions. Thus many Chartists did not participate in the final rising in Newport and simply waited in the outskirts of the town.

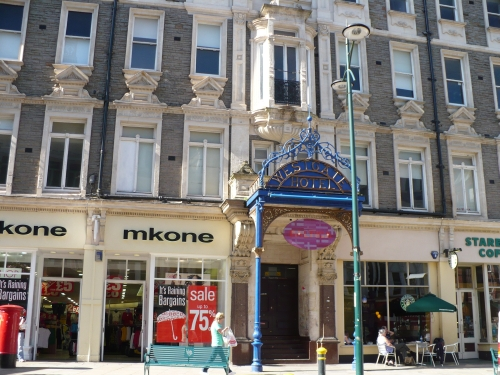
Westgate Hotel, Newport

Rumours of a possible Chartist rising and alleged violence elsewhere, following the earlier arrest of Chartist leader Henry Vincent and his imprisonment at the gaol in Monmouth, meant that the authorities expected there might be a riot. The sheer scale of the rising, however was not fully appreciated until 3 November, the day before the rising. The authorities quickly prepared. The Mayor of Newport Thomas Phillips had sworn in 500 Special Constables and asked for more troops to be sent. There were about 60 soldiers stationed in Newport already, and he gathered 32 soldiers of the 45th (Nottinghamshire) Regiment of Foot in the Westgate Hotel where the Chartist prisoners were held.

== Climax of the Rising ==
It is estimated that nearly 10,000 Chartist sympathisers marched on the town. The Chartists were convinced that some of their fellows had been imprisoned at the Westgate Hotel. Filing quickly down the steep Stow Hill, the Chartists arrived at the small square in front of the hotel at about 9.30 am. It is unclear whether the Chartists knew that the hotel was defended by soldiers, who had only arrived at the hotel shortly before their march on the town began.

The flash point came when the Chartists, who had surrounded the hotel arranged in regular order, demanded the release of those imprisoned inside, when one side or the other (it is not known which) began firing. A brief, violent and bloody battle ensued. The soldiers defending the hotel despite being greatly outnumbered by the large and very angry crowd, had vastly superior firepower. As many as 80 shots were fired by the Chartists into the hotel, and the Chartists did manage to enter the building temporarily, but were forced to retreat in disarray. After a fiercely fought battle, lasting approximately half an hour, between 10 and 24 of their number had been killed and upwards of 50 had been wounded.

Amongst the defenders of the hotel, Mayor Thomas Phillips was badly wounded, shot in the arm and groin whilst calling on the Chartists to lay down their arms, and one soldier was seriously hurt, along with two of the special constables. Another of the defenders, Sergeant James Daily, had received six slugs to the head. As the chartists fled they abandoned many of their weapons, a selection of which can still be seen in Newport Museum.

Some of the Chartist dead were buried in St. Woolos parish church (now Newport Cathedral) in the town where there is still a plaque to their memory.

== Westgate Hotel First Shots Question ==
Sources differ as to who opened fire first, and for what reason. Edward Patton, a carpenter who gave testimony at the trial of John Frost and who claimed not to be a Chartist but instead merely an observer present at the scene to "see what happened", claimed that he did not know who fired first, but that it was "likely enough that firing began from inside the Westgate Hotel". R.G. Gammage, a Chartist who disapproved of violence, claimed in his 1854 history of the Chartist movement that some of the crowd had fired through the windows before the soldiers returned their fire. Thomas Bevan Oliver, a special constable guarding the door of the hotel, claimed that he had bumped the door against the gun of one of the Chartists, accidentally discharging it.

== Aftermath ==
Dramatisation of the trial of the Chartists at Shire Hall, including background information.

In the aftermath 200 or more Chartists were arrested for being involved and twenty-one were charged with high treason. All three main leaders of the rising, John Frost, Zephaniah Williams, and William Jones, were found guilty on the charge of high treason and were sentenced at the Shire Hall in Monmouth to be hanged, drawn and quartered. They were to be the last people to be sentenced to this punishment in England and Wales.

After a nationwide petitioning campaign and, extraordinarily, direct lobbying of the Home Secretary by the Lord Chief Justice the government eventually commuted the sentences of each to transportation for life. Other Chartists involved in some way included James Stephens, John Lovell, John Rees and William Price, and according to some accounts Allan Pinkerton.

Testimonies exist from contemporaries, such as the Yorkshire Chartist Ben Wilson, that a successful rising at Newport was to have been the signal for a national uprising. Older histories suggested that Chartism slipped into a period of internal division after Newport. In fact the movement was remarkably buoyant (and remained so until late 1842). Initially, while the majority of Chartists, under the leadership of Feargus O'Connor, concentrated on petitioning for Frost, Williams and Jones to be pardoned, significant minorities in Sheffield, East End of London and Bradford planned their own risings in response. Samuel Holberry led an aborted rising in Sheffield on 12 January; police action thwarted a major disturbance in the East End of London on 14 January, and on 26 January a few hundred Bradford Chartists staged a rising in the hope of precipitating a domino effect across the country. After this Chartism turned to a process of internal renewal and more systematic organisation, but the transported and imprisoned Newport Chartists were regarded as heroes and martyrs amongst workers.

Meanwhile, the Establishment and middle classes became convinced that the rising meant all Chartists were dangerously violent. Newport Mayor Thomas Phillips was proclaimed a national hero for his part in crushing the rising and was knighted by Queen Victoria barely six weeks later.

Frost himself was eventually given an unconditional pardon in 1856 and allowed to return to Britain, receiving a triumphant welcome in Newport. But he never lived in Newport again, settling instead in Stapleton near Bristol, where he continued to publish articles advocating reform until his death, aged 93, in 1877.

== Commemoration ==
Interest in the Newport Rising was kept alive through occasional articles in the Monmouthshire Merlin and South Wales Argus. In 1939, to commemorate the centenary of the Rising, Newport Borough Council erected a plaque on the Post Office building near the birthplace of John Frost. In the 1960s, redevelopment of Newport led to the creation of a central square which was named John Frost Square. The Chartist mural (see below) was situated in an underpass leading to the square. Newport Museum has a display relating to the uprising which includes homemade weapons. In 1991 three statues, 'Union, Prudence, Energy' by Christopher Kelly, commemorating the uprising were installed on Commercial Street at the front of the Westgate Hotel. In 2015 it was announced that Duffryn High School was to be renamed John Frost School.

The charity Our Chartist Heritage organises the annual Newport Rising festival around the anniversary, which includes a torchlit march to Westgate Square; an annual Chartist Convention is also held in the city. In 2019 the charity reopened the Westgate Hotel, which had stood empty for years, as an events venue, though it had closed again by 2023.

Commemorative sites in other communities includes a 26 ft tall statue of a Chartist designed by Sebastian Boyson, erected by Caerphilly County Borough Council near the Chartist Bridge at Blackwood. The Shire Hall in Monmouth, scene of the Chartist trial in 1840, has a preserved courtroom and displays relating to the trial. A plaque commemorating the departure of Frost, Williams and Jones from Chepstow by ship to Portsmouth on the first stage of their transportation voyage is situated on the Chepstow river front.

=== John Frost Square mural ===
In the 1960s, as part of a redevelopment scheme, a new square was named John Frost Square to commemorate the leader of the Rising, and in 1978 a 35 metres (115 ft) long mosaic mural, by Kenneth Budd, was created in a pedestrian underpass in the square. In 2007, an introductory panel was removed, and it was proposed that, as part of a further redevelopment scheme, the mural would be removed. Proposals to demolish the mural were restated in 2012. Despite a campaign to protect the mural, the council's contractors demolished it on 3 October 2013. A trust is to be set up to commission a new memorial with £50,000 of funding provided by Newport City Council.

On 4 November 2019, exactly 180 years since the Chartist uprising, a new mural was unveiled. The new mural is a copy of the original, but smaller and in four panels. It was created by Oliver Budd, son of the original mural's creator. The panels are located on Cefn Road, Rogerstone. It also includes an information board telling the history of Chartism.

== In popular culture ==
In literature, the events of the Rising have been portrayed in:

- John Watkins's 1841 play John Frost: A Chartist Play, in Five Acts
- James Augustus St John's 1843 novel Sir Cosmo Digby, a novel of the Monmouthshire Riots
- Alexander Cordell's 1959 novel Rape of the Fair Country
- Vivien Annis Bailey's 1995 novel Children of Rebecca published by Honno ISBN 1-870206-17-7

The track "Ballad of Solomon Jones" by Jon Langford on albums Skull Orchard Revisited (2011) and The Legend of LL (2015) is partially set during the Newport Rising.

The track "The View from Stow Hill", on the Manic Street Preachers' 2014 album Futurology, written by bassist Nicky Wire, was based on the events of the Newport Rising.

The 2016 ITV biographical TV series Victoria offers a fictionalised account of the Newport Rising in which Queen Victoria is depicted as ordering the drawing and quartering of the ringleaders to be commuted to transportation to Van Diemen's Land (Tasmania) after learning that one of the men is the nephew of a member of her household staff. The commutation is intended as a signal to the people that her reign is to be a merciful one.

In August 2019, in the BBC TV series Who Do You Think You Are?, Thomas Jones Phillips, a solicitor at the time of the Rising, was revealed to be an ancestor of TV producer Michael Whitehall and of his son, actor and comedian Jack Whitehall.

In August 2022, the Welsh ragga metal band Dub War released the album Westgate Under Fire, inspired by the events of the Newport Rising.
