= Westgate Hotel =

Historic hotel in Newport, Wales

- Gwesty Porth Gorllewin
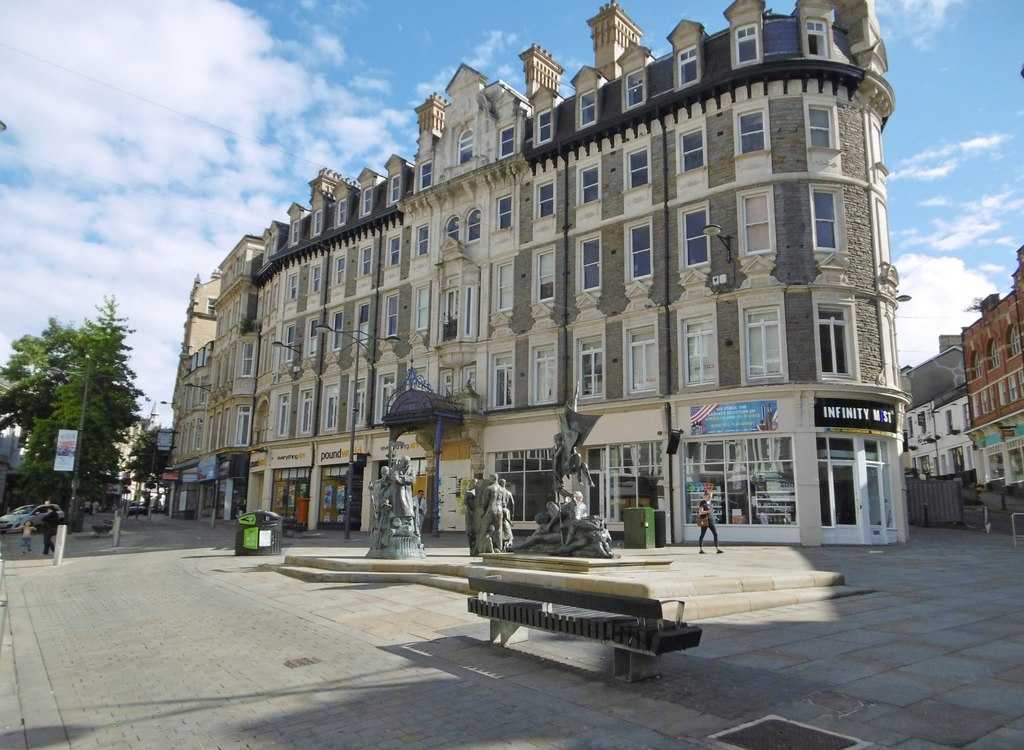
- Westgate Hotel from Westgate Square

- Location within Newport

General information
- Status: Mostly derelict
- Architectural style: Regency and French Renaissance
- Classification: Grade II listed
- Location: Commercial Street, Newport, Westgate Buildings, Commercial Street, Newport, Wales
- Coordinates: 51.587814°N 2.996713°W
- Current tenants: Unoccupied
- Opened: 1884
- Renovated: 1950
- Closed: 2000s

Design and construction
- Architect: E. A. Lansdowne

The Westgate Hotel, Commercial Street, Newport, Wales is a hotel building dating from the 19th century. On 4 November 1839 the hotel saw the major scenes of the Newport Rising, when 3,000 Chartists, some of them armed, led by John Frost marched on Newport to attempt to secure the release of five of their number who were being held under arrest at the hotel. In the fighting between about 60 soldiers of the 45th Regiment of Foot and police on one side, and a larger number of Chartists on the other, 10–22 Chartists were killed and more than 50 wounded. The hotel is a Grade II listed building.

== History ==
After the demolition of Newport's original West city gate, the site was reclaimed and a hotel constructed in 1779 on the site of a previous 15th-century house.

The Westgate Hotel was the location of the last large-scale armed rebellion against authority in Great Britain. On 4 November 1839, local politician and activist John Frost led a protest march of 3,000 Chartists, some of them armed, into the centre of Newport. Here he discovered that several Chartists had been arrested and were being held in the Westgate Hotel by police, who were reinforced by soldiers of the 45th Regiment of Foot. Firing began (it is unclear who fired first), and in the fighting 10-22 people were killed and more than 50 others wounded. As many as 80 shots were fired into the hotel during the rising. The hotel was demolished in 1884 and rebuilt in French Renaissance style. Designed by local architect E. A. Lansdowne, it incorporated six shops at ground floor level to increase the site's rental income, and placed a new five-storey hotel above, with twice the floor size of the hotel it replaced, which included an ornate ballroom. Built by local builder John Linton, it was leased from its opening in 1886 to Samuel Dean of the Castle Hotel for twenty one years.

The pillars of the old entrance portico were kept and re-erected in the vestibule of the new building, where they remain. Holes in the pillars have long been pointed out as bullet holes from the Rising. When the portico was taken down in September 1884, W. N. Johns recorded that four roughly made slugs were found inside the pillars, and a Western Mail report on the new hotel in May 1886 described the old pillars as perforated by Chartist bullets, with the holes still visible. From the 1970s the holes were sometimes said to be fixing holes for railings or gates, and the Cadw listing describes the bullet-hole tradition as unlikely. In 2023 Newport Museum had the holes examined by a forensic firearms expert. Laboratory tests found little bullet residue, which the museum attributed to decades of handling, but its collections manager concluded from the historical evidence that the holes were made by bullets.

In 2009 the building was placed on the Buildings at Risk Register as it had been substantially unoccupied for many years and the condition of its interior was beginning to cause concern. The main staircase and richly decorated public rooms are amongst the best surviving examples in the UK of their period. In 2012 Newport Unlimited announced an initiative to bring the hotel back into use. In May 2017 the property was offered for auction with a guide price of between £1.5M and £1.75M. The building was purchased in October 2017 by Rugby Property Assets Limited of Warwickshire. In January 2024 Newport City Council's planning committee heard that the building had suffered vandalism, fires, water damage and a partial ceiling collapse. It agreed that if the owner did not carry out urgent repairs, the council should use enforcement powers to do the work itself and recover the cost.

== Chartist legacy ==
In 1991 three statues, titled "Union, Prudence, Energy" by sculptor Christopher Kelly, commemorating the 1839 Chartist uprising were installed on Commercial Street in front of the hotel. The hotel also featured in the 1978 Chartist Mural which was demolished during the 2013 development of Friars Walk in Newport city centre.

The story of the rebellion was reflected in the Manic Street Preachers' 2014 song "The View from Stow Hill".

In July 2019, Our Chartist Heritage announced they would re-open part of the Westgate Buildings for a temporary display. The charity worked with the consortium who own the building, and local Newport graphic artist Josh Cranton, to bring the building up to a viable state for public access, ahead of the anniversary of the Chartist Rising. The interior was repainted and a free display was organised to commemorate the events of the rising.

== Gallery ==
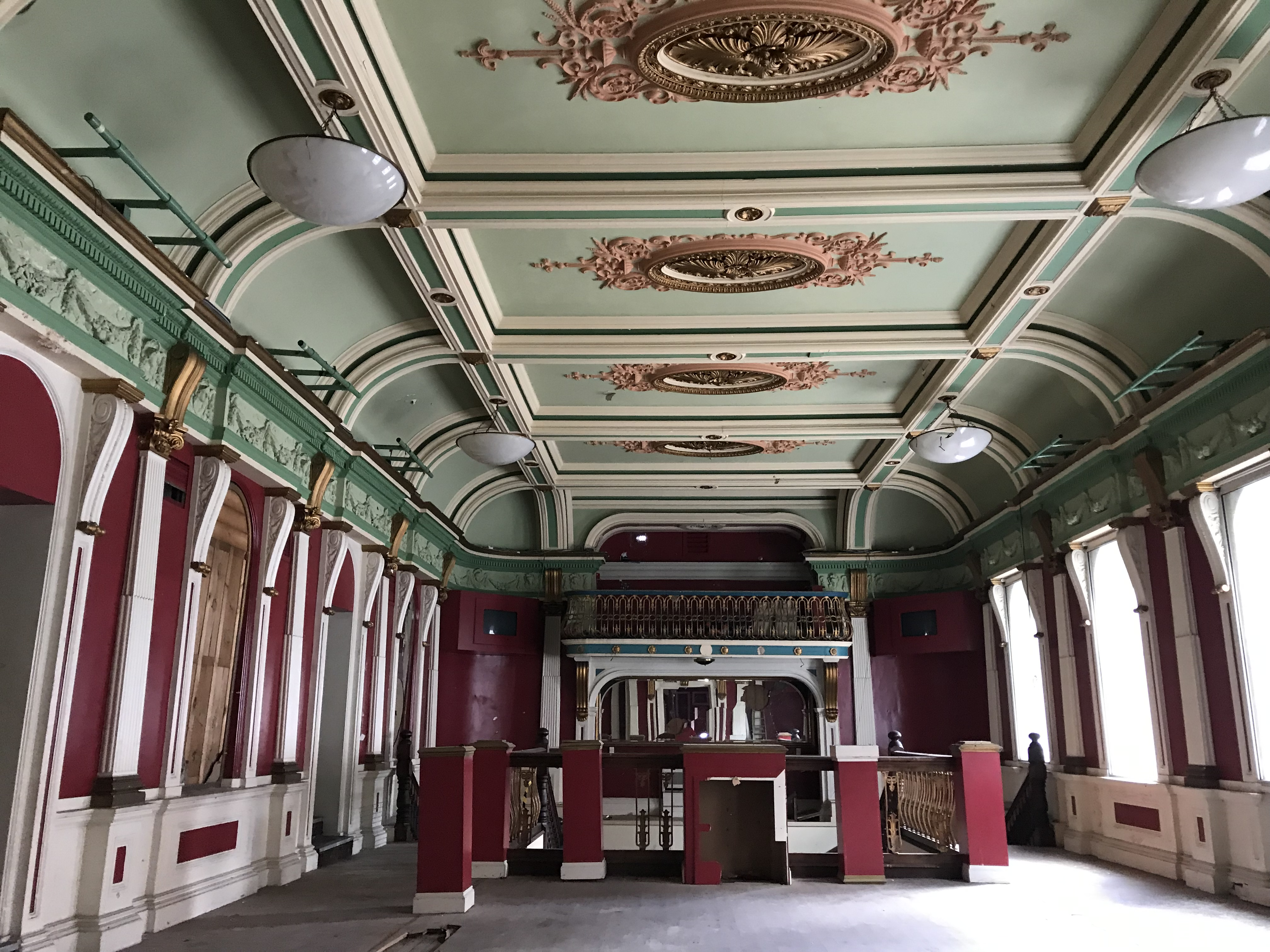
Westgate Hotel interior shown during the 2019 partial opening

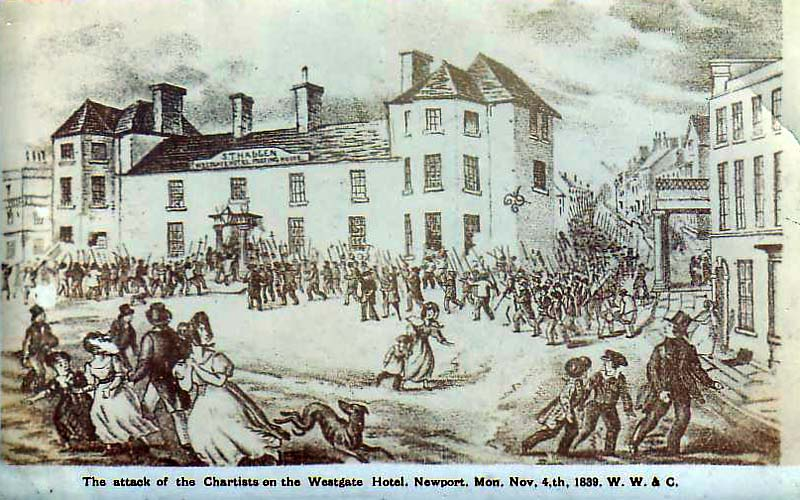
The attack of the Chartists on the Westgate Hotel, 4 November 1839

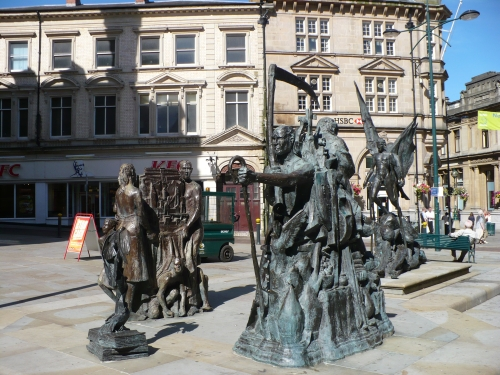
Union, Prudence, Energy, sculpture outside The Westgate Hotel commemorating the Chartist Movement and 1839 Newport Rising
