= Tredegarville =

- Neighbourhood
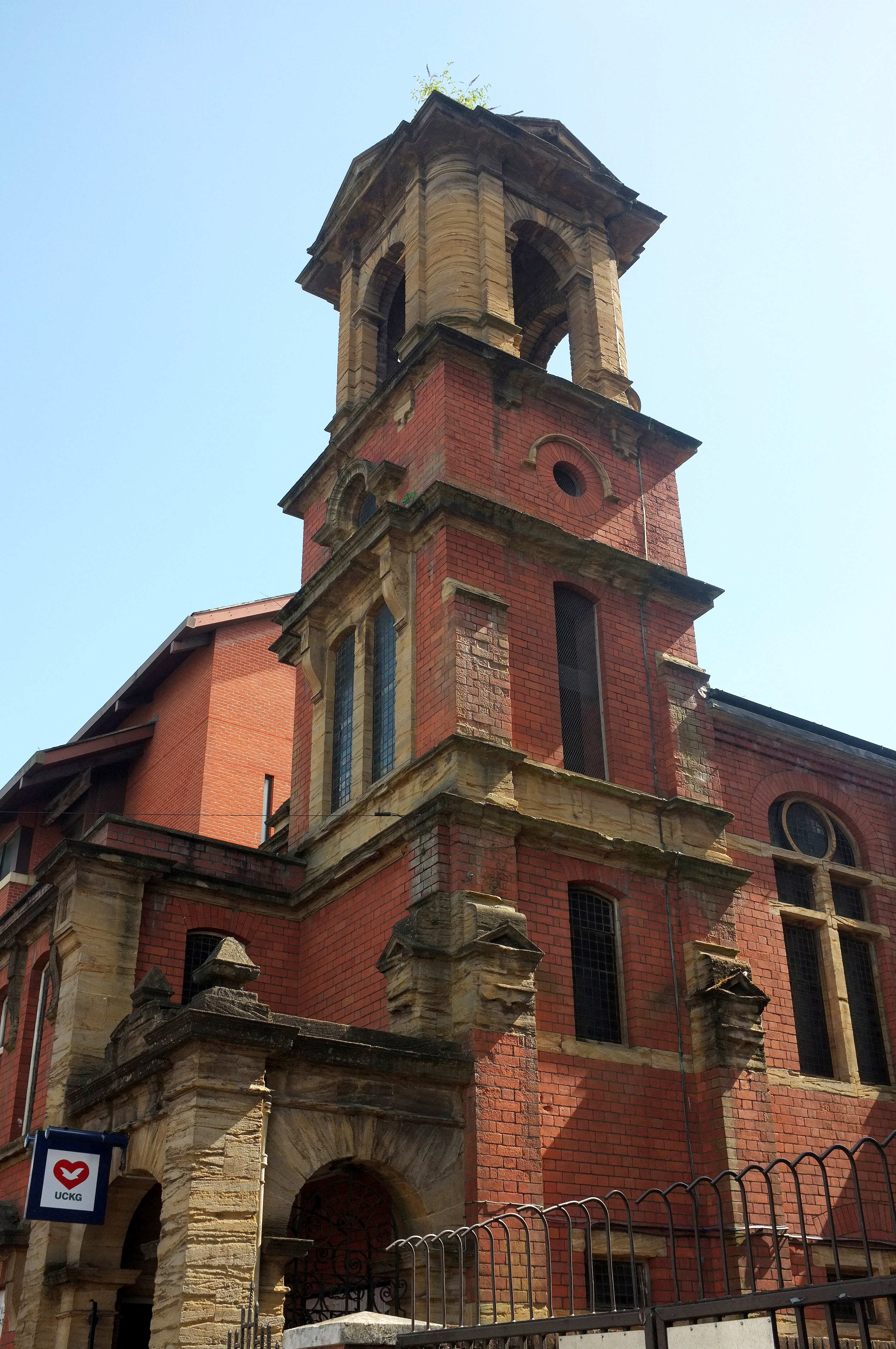
- Former Unitarian Church in Tredegarville

- Tredegarville location within Cardiff
- Coordinates: 51.4852°N 3.1681°W
- Country: Wales
- Town: Cardiff
- Established: 1850s

Tredegarville was the name given to an upper class area of streets and villas in Cardiff, Wales, developed during the second half of the 19th century. The area is now part of Roath.

== History and description ==
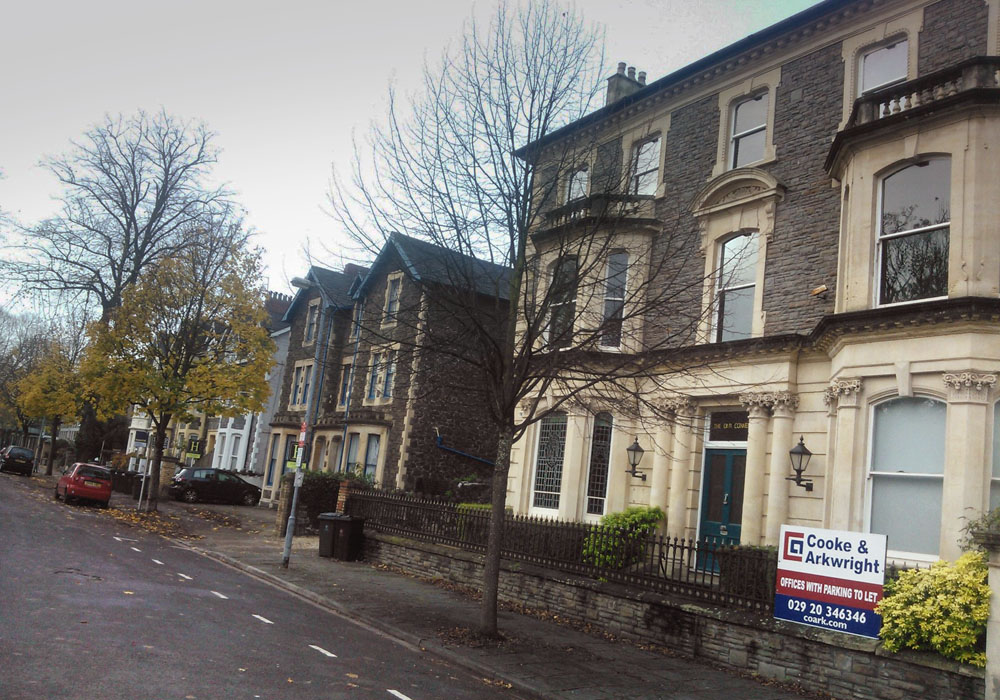
Villas in The Walk

Tredegarville consisted of the parallel streets at the south end of City Road, including The Parade and The Walk and Richmond Crescent, crossed by East Grove and West Grove. They were designed and laid out for the wealthy Tredegar Estate by their architects, W.G. & E Habershon (who became Habershon & Fawckner after the Habershon brothers parted ways). Development began in 1857. Habershon & Fawckner created Richmond Crescent circa 1888.

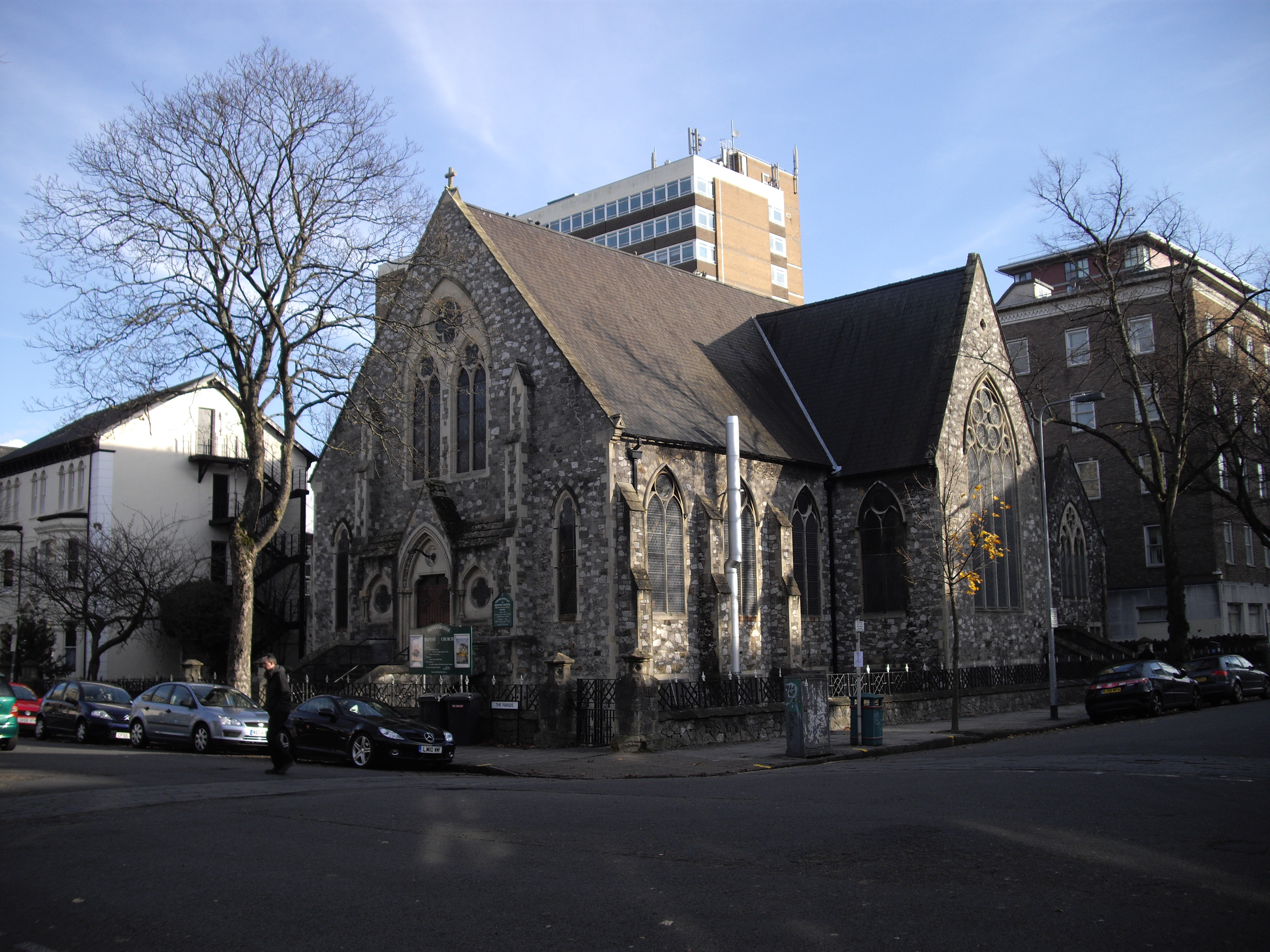
Tredegarville Baptist Church in 2010

William Gilbee Habershon is credited with Tredegarville Baptist Church (1861–63) on The Parade, financed by local coal magnates, the Cory family at a cost of £3600 (the Corys became members of the congregation). Habershon & Fawckner also designed a mansion on Richmond Crescent, named 'The Grove', for Cardiff shop owner James Howell and family. It was later purchased by the city (1913) and became 'The Mansion House' and home of the city mayor.

A primary school was also built in the area, Tredegarville Primary School, and it is still open to this day since its opening in the 1860s. Next door to the primary school, the Anglican Church of St James the Great was completed in 1894 on Newport Road to serve Tredegarville and the surrounding area.

== Sources ==
- Newman, John (1995), The Buildings of Wales: Glamorgan, Penguin Books, ISBN 0-14-071056-6
