= Westgrove =

Westgrove may refer to:

- Westgrove, Queensland, a locality in the Maranoa Region, Queensland, Australia
- West Grove (Cardiff), a road in Roath, Cardiff, Wales
