= Kings Monkton School =

Location
- West Grove; Cardiff, Wales, CF24 3XL; United Kingdom
- Coordinates: 51.4856°N 3.1697°W

Information
- Type: Private day school
- Motto: Be the best you can be
- Established: 1870s as King's College and Monkton House; 1994 as Kings Monkton School
- Department for Education URN: 402016 Tables
- Principal: Paul Norton
- Years offered: Nursery to 13
- Gender: Mixed
- Age: 3 to 18
- Houses: 4
- School fees: £3,740 to £5,464 per term
- Website: www.kingsmonkton.org.uk

Kings Monkton School, formerly Monkton House and King's College, is a co-educational private day school for children aged 3–18. It is located in Roath, Cardiff near the city's Mansion House and Cardiff University. The school is owned by the Principal and Vice Principal. Paul Norton has been the school's principal since 2013. The school has 303 pupils with maximum class sizes of 18. The Independent Schools Association named Kings Monkton School as the fastest growing independent school in the UK.

== History ==
Kings Monkton School was formed from the amalgamation of two schools, King's College and Monkton House in 1994. Monkton House was founded in 1870 by Henry Shewbrooks and King's College was founded later in the same decade.

In 2009 the school was taken over by the CfBT Education Trust which invested £750,000 into the school. The trust intended to end its financial support in 2013 leaving the school with financial issues. The existing principal resigned his position citing his reason as "job security". In 2013 it was bought by Heathfield Independent Schools, owned by Welsh businessman Andrew McCarthy. Over the six year period the school was owned by Heathfield they invested nearly £2.5m into modernising and improving the school's environment and facilities. In 2019, Andrew McCarthy sold the business to Paul Norton, principal since 2013, and Karen Norton, assistant principal since 2015. The school was incorporated as a private limited company by the two owners.

In 2014 the school opened a sixth-form college offering a range of qualifications including A-levels, BTECs and Welsh Baccalaureate.

Kings Monkton School celebrated its 150th anniversary in 2022.

== Notable alumni ==
- Ray Milland (1907–1986), Oscar-winning film actor
- Thomas Dalton-Morgan (1917–2004), fighter pilot and flying ace
- Terry Nation (1930–1997), television screenwriter, creator of the Daleks.
- Morfydd Clark (1990), actress, known for The Lord of the Rings: The Rings of Power
