= Thomas Dalton-Morgan =

British World War II flying ace

Thomas Frederick Dalton-Morgan
- Born: 23 March 1917; Cardiff, Wales
- Died: 18 September 2004 (aged 87); Australia
- Military career
- Allegiance: United Kingdom
- Branch: Royal Air Force
- Service years: 1935–1952
- Rank: Group Captain
- Service number: 37415
- Unit: No. 22 Squadron RAF
- Commands: RAF Wunstorf; Gutersloh Wing; Ibsley Wing; No. 43 Squadron RAF
- Conflicts: Second World War: Battle of Britain
- Awards: Distinguished Service Order; Officer of the Order of the British Empire; Distinguished Flying Cross & Bar; Mentioned in Despatches; Bronze Star Medal (United States)

Thomas Frederick Dalton-Morgan, DSO, OBE, DFC & Bar (23 March 1917 – 18 September 2004) was a fighter pilot and flying ace of the Royal Air Force during the Second World War. He flew during the Battle of Britain, and is counted amongst the ranks of 'The Few'.

== Early life ==
Thomas Frederick Dalton-Morgan, a descendant of the English Civil War general Sir Thomas Morgan as well as the seventeenth century privateer Henry Morgan, was born in Cardiff, Wales, on 23 March 1917. He attended Kings Monkton School in Cardiff and then Taunton School.

In August 1935, Dalton-Morgan applied to the Royal Air Force (RAF) for a short service commission and commenced initial training. He was duly granted a commission as an acting pilot officer on probation on 21 October. He commenced further training in November at No. 11 Flying Training School at Wittering. Confirmed as a pilot officer on 26 August 1936, three months later he was posted to No. 22 Squadron. A Coastal Command unit, this was based at Donibristle and equipped with the Vickers Vildebeest torpedo bomber. He was promoted to flying officer on 26 April 1938.

In late May 1939, Dalton-Morgan was seconded to the training department at the Air Ministry in London. He was involved in the equipping of the Royal Navy's Fleet Air Arm and also engaged in the training of its air personnel.

== Second World War ==
In early June 1940 Dalton-Morgan, desiring a return to operational duties, went to No. 6 Operational Training Unit at Sutton Bridge for a refresher in flying. Now a flight lieutenant following a promotion the previous April, two weeks later he was posted to No. 43 Squadron as a flight commander. With minimal fighter experience as a fighter pilot he flew Hawker Hurricanes from RAF Tangmere (part of No. 11 Group RAF).

=== Battle of Britain ===
Dalton-Morgan's first 'kill' came on 12 July 1940 when he shared in the downing of a Heinkel He 111 bomber.

On 13 August 1940, the Luftwaffe began Operation Eagle Attack, which the Oberkommando der Luftwaffe (OKL) began a major effort to destroy RAF Fighter Command in southern England. At 06:25, Dalton-Morgan was scrambled with 43 Squadron to support 64, 87 and 601 Squadrons. The RAF formations intercepted 20 Junkers Ju 88s from I. and 18 Ju 88s from II./Kampfgeschwader 54. They were escorted by V.(Z)./Lehrgeschwader 1. The German objective was to attack RAF Odiham and RAF Farnborough. No. 43 Squadron intercepted the Germans between Guildford and Brighton. Dalton-Morgan attacked a Ju 88 from the stab staffel, perhaps piloted by Oberleutnant Kurt Erdmann. He damaged the rudder and engine but was struck by return fire or became the victim of one of the escorting fighters; possibly Unteroffizier Walter Gerigk. Both the Ju 88 and Hurricane crashed and the German crew were captured by a local policeman. Dalton-Morgan had taken off without properly changing because of the rapid scramble, and he had difficulty and convincing the local constabulary he was not a member of the German crew.

Quickly returning to his squadron, Dalton-Morgan was soon flying combat sorties and shot down four more enemy aircraft over the next three weeks. In early September 1940 he added three Messerschmitt Bf 109s fighters to his tally. On 6 September he again came worse off in combat with Bf 109s and he was wounded in the face and knee and was forced to crash land his Hurricane.

Distinguished Flying Cross (DFC) was gazetted on 6 September 1940:

This officer has shown great resolution as a fighter pilot and has led his flight, and at times his squadron, with conspicuous success. He has displayed great courage and determination in the face of heavy enemy odds, and has destroyed seven enemy aircraft. His behaviour in action has been an inspiration to the pilots in his flight.

Once more returning to No. 43 Squadron on 7 September, Dalton-Morgan now took over command and relocated the squadron to Northumberland to refit with new fighters and to train replacement pilots.

=== Pilot trainer ===
Following the end of the Battle of Britain in October 1940, Dalton-Morgan concentrated on passing on his experience to new pilots. He also worked on developing the Hurricane fighter into a night-fighter with great success. He soon accounted for six further 'kills' flying his Hurricane at night. One of his most successful periods was over the nights of the 6 and 7 May 1941 when he shot down three Luftwaffe bombers over Glasgow. He was promoted to temporary squadron leader on 1 June.

On 8 June he shot down a Junkers Ju 88 and two further 'kills' followed. On 24 July he intercepted another Ju 88 off May Island. Despite his engine starting to fail he pressed home his attack and downed the enemy bomber. His engine then completely quit and he was forced to land on the water, a highly dangerous exercise. He was later picked up by the Royal Navy.

For this attack he received a Bar to his DFC on 31 May 1941:

This officer has displayed exceptional skill both as a squadron commander and an individual fighter. During two consecutive nights in May 1941, he destroyed three enemy aircraft bringing his total victories to 13. Squadron Leader Morgan has contributed in a large measure to the high standard of operational efficiency of the squadron

On 2 October 1941 he shot down another bomber, off Berwick-on-Tweed. Finally, in February 1942, Dalton-Morgan was rested with a tally of at least 14 aircraft shot down and several damaged.

=== Distinguished Service Order ===
After a short period working as a fighter controller at RAF Turnhouse, near Edinburgh, he was promoted to temporary wing commander on 1 June 1942, and promoted to squadron leader (war-substantive) on 26 August. He returned to operations in late 1942 to become leader of the Ibsley Wing. Commanding eight fighter squadrons, Dalton-Morgan organised long-range offensive sorties and bomber escort duties over northern France. He damaged an Bf 109 in December 1943, and then shot down a Focke-Wulf Fw 190 fighter and damaged another during a sweep over the French port of Brest. He was awarded the Distinguished Service Order on 25 May 1943:

Since being awarded a bar to the D.F.C. in May, 1941, this officer has destroyed four enemy aircraft, bringing his total victories to 17 aircraft destroyed.

=== 4th Fighter Group ===
Dalton-Morgan's bomber escort experience saw him attached to the 4th Fighter Group of the US 8th Air Force and flew over 70 combat sorties with the group. Promoted to wing commander (war-substantive) on 12 December 1943, he served as operations officer with the 2nd Tactical Air Force.

In the buildup to the Normandy Landings he was part of the planning team organising the roster of ground targets. In January 1945 he was appointed an Officer of the Order of the British Empire. Shortly before the end of the war, he learned his brother John had been killed after being shot down in a de Havilland Mosquito.

== Post war ==
After the war he remained in Germany with 2nd Tactical Air Force. He was promoted to the substantive rank of squadron leader on 1 September 1945 and attended the RAF staff College, becoming a senior instructor at the School of Land/Air Warfare. He was mentioned in despatches in 1946, the same year he also received the US Bronze Star Medal.

Promoted to wing commander on 1 July 1947, he commanded the Vickers Vampire equipped Gutersloh Wing before taking command of RAF Wunstorf. He resigned from the RAF on 4 April 1952 with the rank of wing commander.

On leaving the RAF, Dalton-Morgan joined the joint UK/Australian weapons testings facility, at Woomera, which he managed for the next 30 years before retiring in Australia. He died on 18 September 2004.
