= E. M. Bruce Vaughan =

Welsh architect (1856–1919)

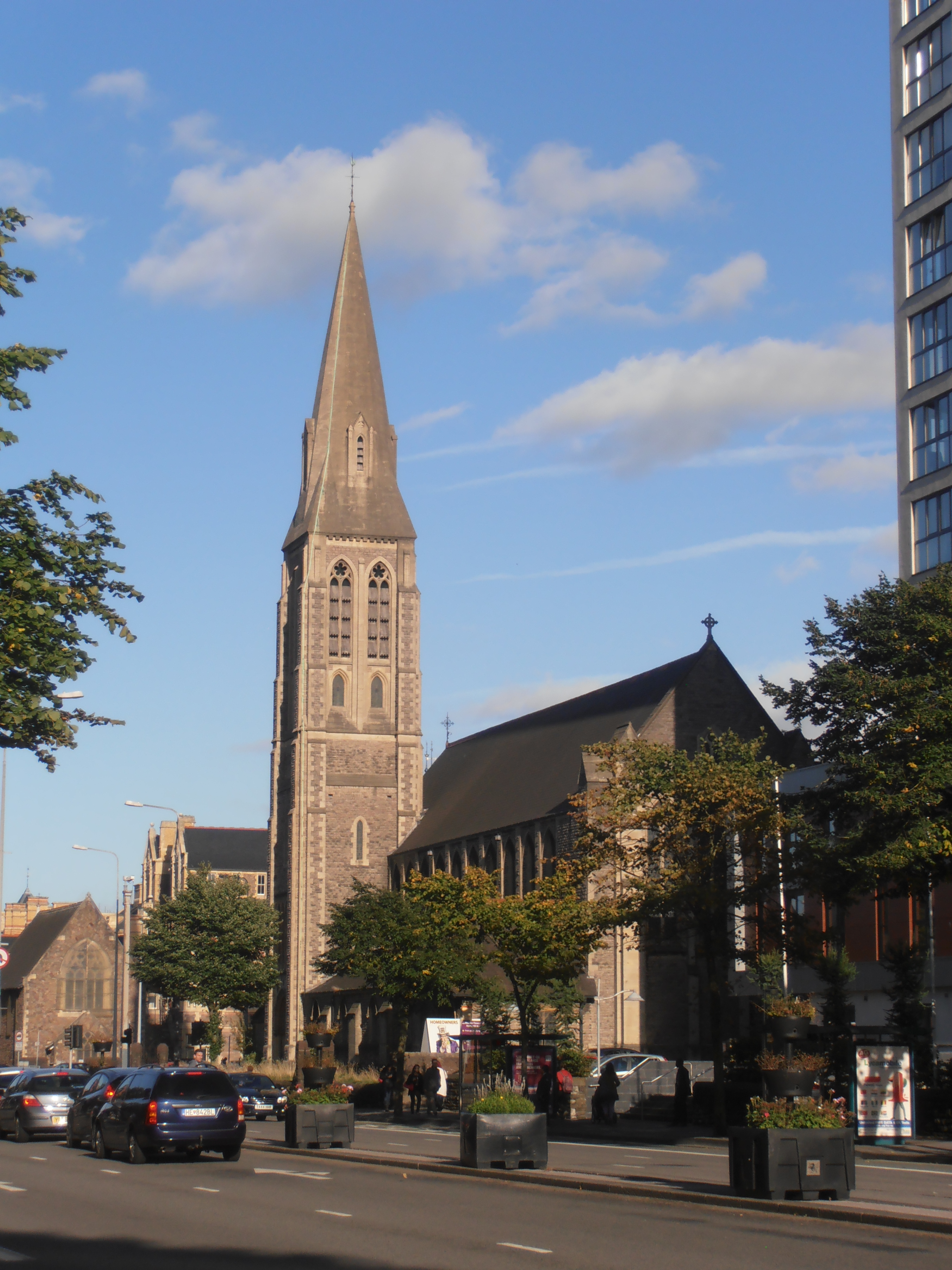
St James the Great, Cardiff

Edwin Montgomery Bruce Vaughan (6 March 1856 – 13 June 1919), known as E. M. Bruce Vaughan, was an ecclesiastical architect from Cardiff, Wales.

== Biography ==
Vaughan was born in Frederick Street, Cardiff and privately schooled in the town. He was articled to local architect W. D. Blessley, studied at Cardiff School of Science and Art and won the Architectural Association medal in 1880.

He was elected to the Royal Institute of British Architects in 1891, designing a large number of churches across South Wales, but also designed several hospitals and a school. The building described as his "masterpiece" is St James Church on Newport Road, Cardiff, completed in 1893.

While serving in the Glamorganshire Home Guard of the Volunteer Force he rose to the honorary rank of Lieutenant-Colonel. Vaughan in later life became a volunteer and fundraiser for the King Edward VII Hospital, which he partly designed, with his work helping to fund an additional 350 beds and £500,000 in funds (much donated by shipowner, John Cory).

Vaughan died in June 1919 "one of the best known men in Cardiff" He had a well-attended funeral at St John's Church and was buried at the cemetery in Adamsdown.

== Notable works ==
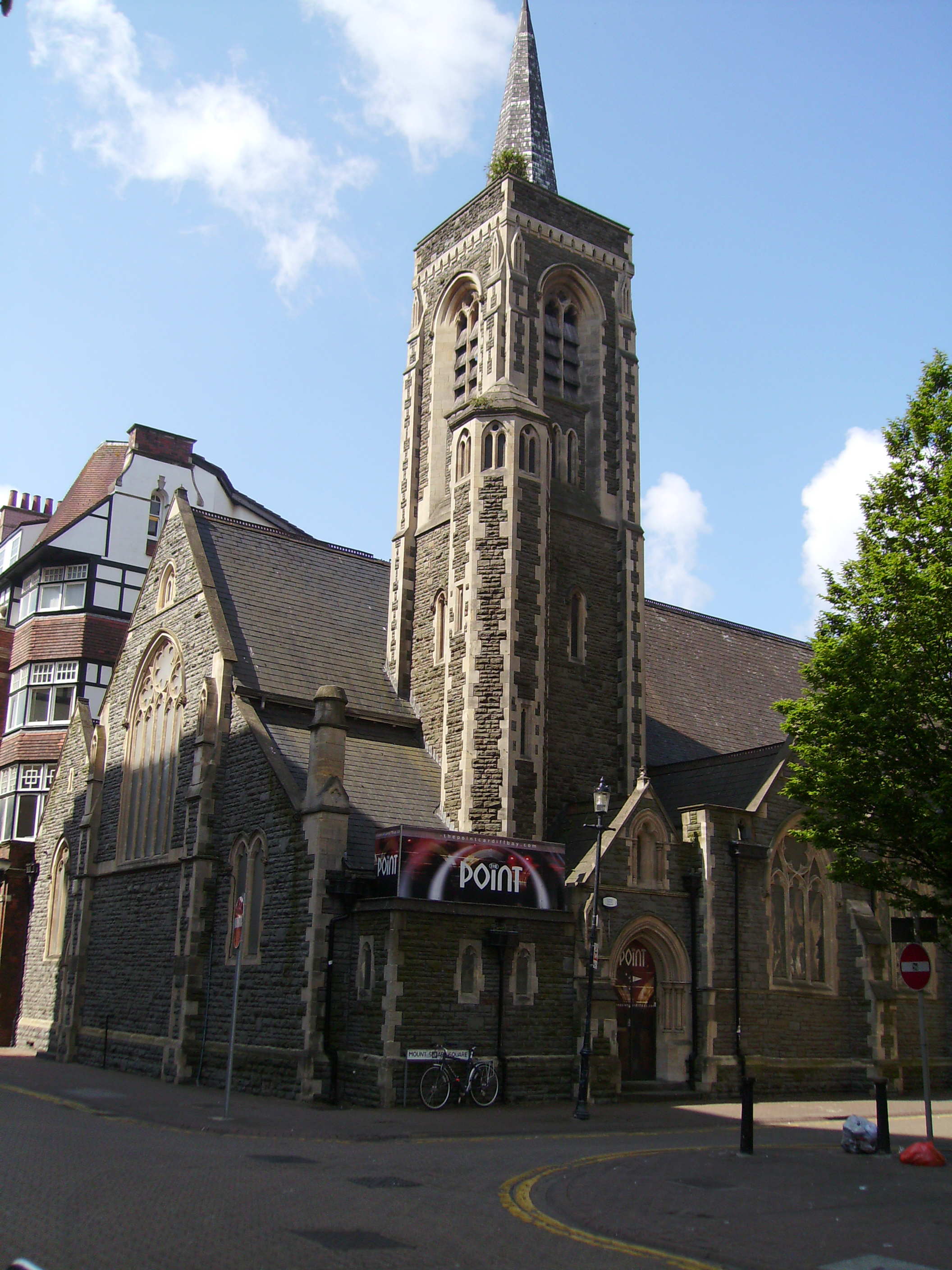
St Stephen's, Butetown

Vaughan was designer of 45 churches in Glamorgan beginning with St Mary Magdalene, Cwmbach (1881/2). Other notable examples included:

- All Saints, Barry
- St James, Adamsdown, Cardiff (1893)
- St Stephen's, Butetown, Cardiff (1902)
- St Jude's, Mount Pleasant, Swansea, (1913–15)

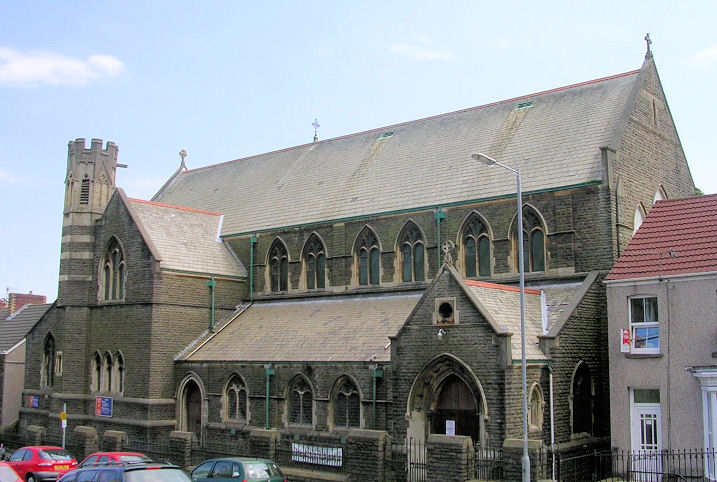
St Jude's Church Swansea

Non-ecclesiastical works included:

- Institute of Physiology, Cardiff University, Newport Road, Cardiff (1915) – Vaughan campaigned successfully to locate the Institute close to the hospital and appointed himself as the designer.
