= Tredegarville Baptist Church =

Church in Cardiff, Wales

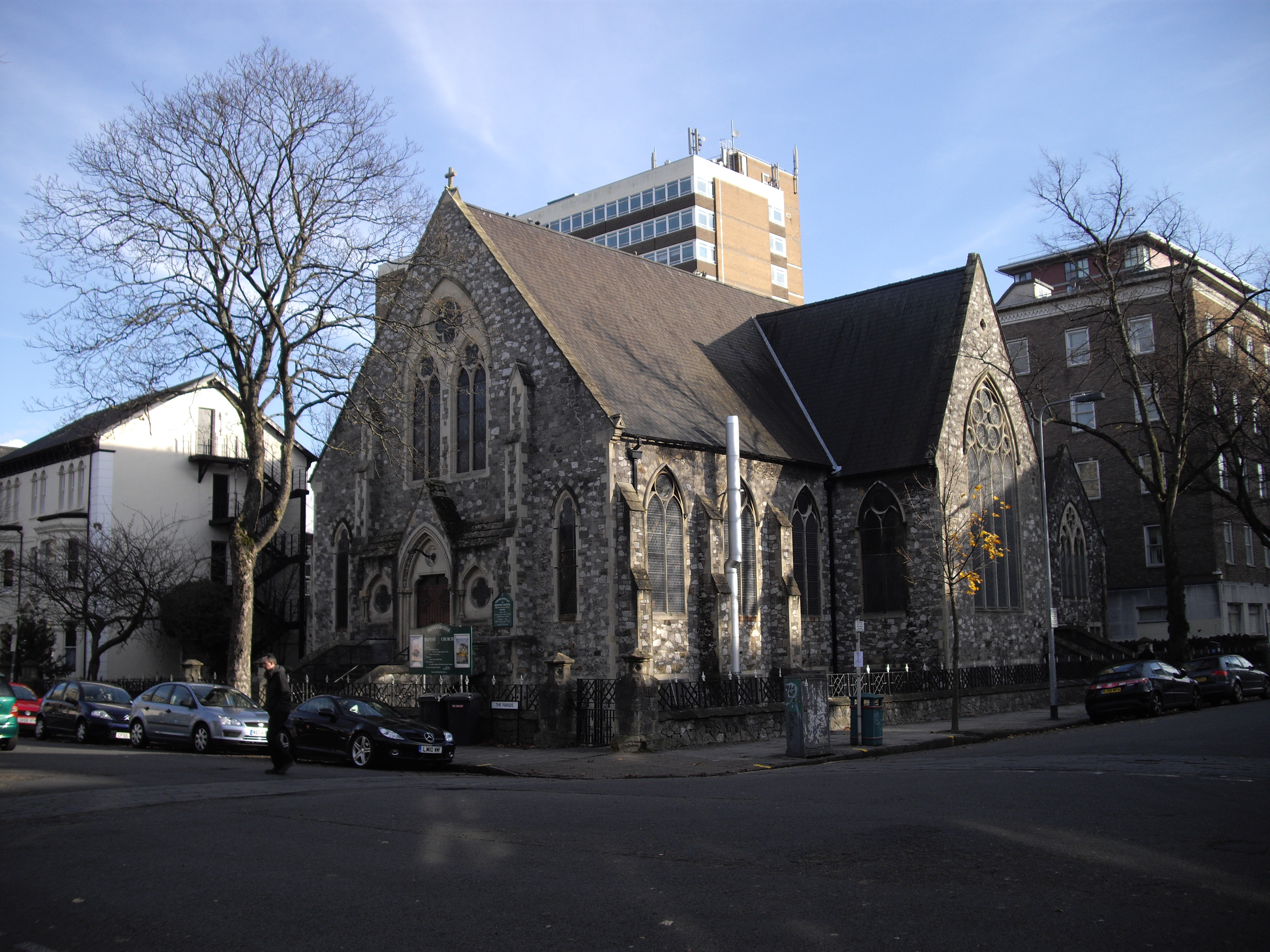

- 51.4851°N 3.1669°W
- Denomination: Baptist

History
- Status: Active
- Founded: 1860

Architecture
- Heritage designation: Grade II
- Designated: 31 March 1999
- Architect: W.G. Habershon
- Groundbreaking: 31 July 1861
- Completed: 22 May 1862
- Construction cost: £3600

Specifications
- Materials: stone

Tredegarville Baptist Church (also uses the name Tredegarville International Church) is a Baptist chapel in the suburb of Roath, Cardiff. It was established to reach Roman Catholics with the Gospel.

== History ==
The church was founded to serve the new affluent development of Tredegarville, which has since been absorbed by Roath. It was formed as an offshoot of Bethany chapel, which was then located in Cardiff City Centre (though would move to suburban premises in Rhiwbina in the 1950s). The minister of Bethany, Alfred Tilly, together with 111 of his parishioners, left to found the new cause. They began in rooms in City Road in 1860. Work commenced the following year on a permanent place of worship. The site was donated by Lord Tredegar himself, who is said to have insisted that the church be cruciform in design. A schoolroom was opened on 3 December 1861, with the chapel itself following in 1862. The limestone used to build the church was once believed to have come from Italy, but is more likely to have hailed from Galway as ballast in coal ships. In its earlier years, the church had two small pinnacles on its roof, but these have since been removed. In addition to the gift of the land from Lord Tredegar, the church was generously supported by the wealthy Cory family. Of an evangelical bent, it founded several missions elsewhere in Cardiff and also engaged in missionary work abroad. William Booth, the founder of the Salvation Army gave his first worship service in Cardiff at the church in 1863 because of Tredegarville's huge effort in establishing the cause. The missionary to China Timothy Richards was also very grateful to Tredegarville for its financial support in his ministry. Tredegarville's missionary to the Congo Henry Richards is also recognised today as one of the greatest Baptist missionaries of America when it adopted the David Livingstone mission as its own.

Grade II Listed since 1999, the church has a present fellowship of around 100. Missionary work is still a feature of its activities, with operations in evangelising Muslims in Roath which is a suburb with a highly diverse ethnic makeup, and in 2013, the church's congregation had members from 84 different nations.
