= Beechwood Park, Newport =

Park in Newport, South Wales

Beechwood Park
- Parc Coed Ffawydd
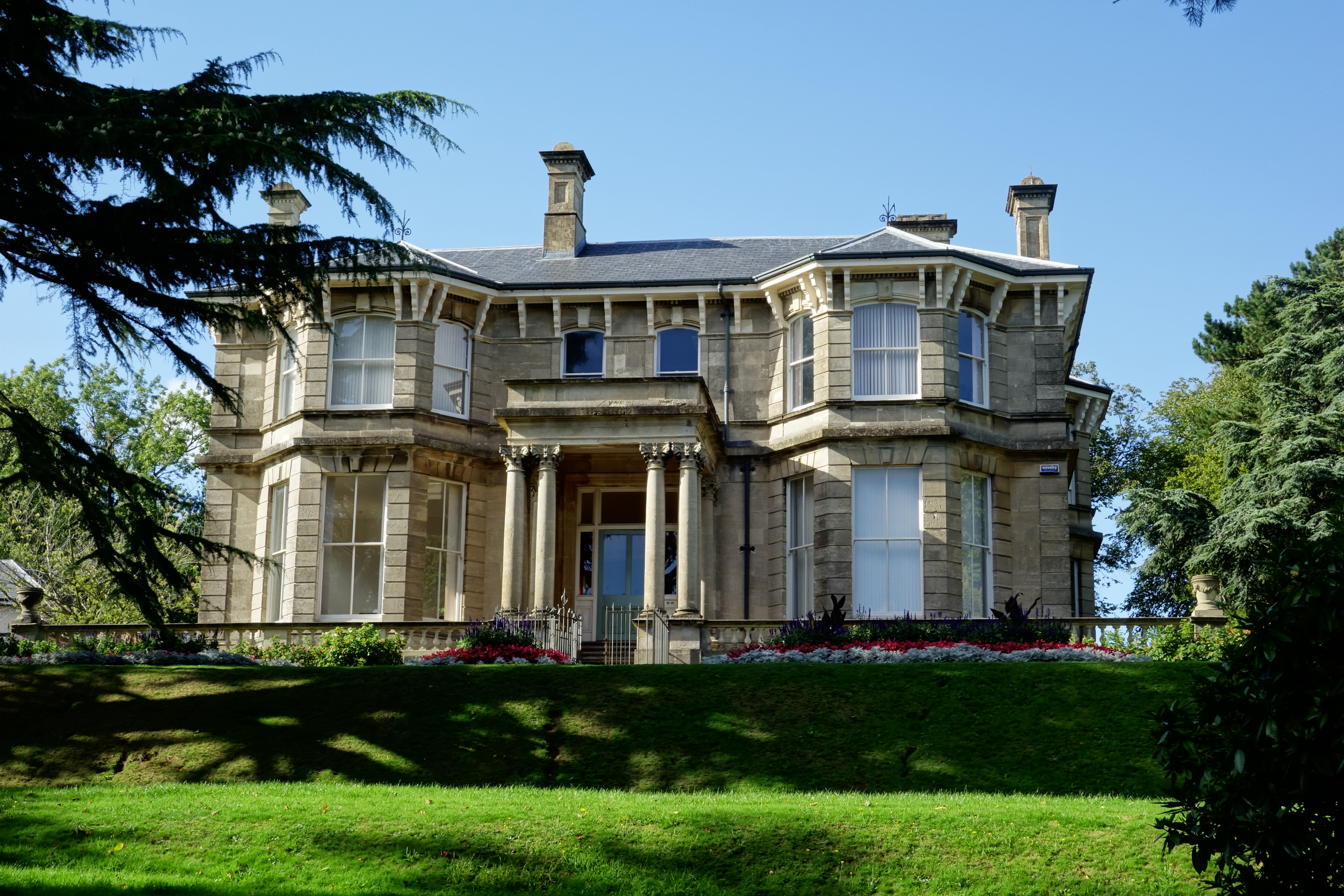
- Beechwood House, a 19th century bath stone community venue in the Park
- Interactive map of Beechwood Park
- Type: Victorian Ornamental Park
- Location: Newport, Wales
- OS grid: ST 33261 88642
- Coordinates: 51.592°N 2.965°W
- Opened: 1900
- Founder: George Fothergill
- Designer: Habershon, Pite & Fawckner
- Owner: Newport City Council
- Open: 7am - 8pm (summer)
- Awards: Green Flag Award
- Terrain: Hill
- Water: Stream
- Parking: On site office parking only
- Public transit: Newport Bus: Hove Avenue - 20A, 20C
- Website: http://www.newport.gov.uk/en/Leisure-Tourism/Countryside--Parks/Parks/Beechwood-park.aspx

Beechwood Park is a thirty-acre public park situated in the eastern Beechwood area of the city of Newport, South Wales. The park is listed on the Cadw/ICOMOS Register of Parks and Gardens of Special Historic Interest in Wales.

== History ==
Beechwood House was built in 1877–1878 as a private residence by George Fothergill, a former Mayor of Newport. It was designed in a classical style using Bath stone, by architects Habershon, Pite & Fawckner. In 1900 the Beechwood estate was purchased by Newport Corporation and opened as a public park.

During World War II the park was used by US military personnel stationed in the city, and it was later used as a tuberculosis clinic, model railway club, and open air school.

== Community ==
The park is protected by a group of local volunteers in the Beechwood Park Group, founded in 2014 with the purpose of organising events for local people and improving the facilities available to visitors, including raising £1,850 for new parasols for outdoor seating.

The park's historical heritage is also protected by the Friends of Newport's Ornamental Parks, established in 2006 to improve the management of Victorian-era parks in the city.

== Facilities ==
Current facilities include two children's play areas, a paddling pool (summer only), a bowling green, a pavilion, and two tennis courts.

In 2013 a café was opened and named Mrs T's. It is open between 9.30am and 4.30pm Monday to Friday, and 9am to 5pm on Saturday and Sunday. The café was extended in 2018 and owner Jayne Thorley has described the new space as suited for afternoon tea, Sunday lunches and special events.

In 2019 the park hosted a weekend of free musical entertainment organised by the Beechwood Parks Events Group in conjunction with Newport City Radio with a range of musical guests, a raffle, food from The Café, and more.

== Renovation ==
In 2006, work began on the renovation and conversion of Beechwood House to become the Beechwood House Entrepreneurship Centre. Newport City Council secured a total of £4.2million of funding from the European Regional Development Fund (ERDF), Welsh Government Local Regeneration Fund, along with further retrospective ERDF funds, for the project. The Centre opened in March 2009.

== Awards ==
Beechwood is listed on the Cadw/ICOMOS Register of Parks and Gardens of Special Historic Interest in Wales. It has held a Green Flag award from Keep Wales Tidy since 2007.
