= St Jude's Church, Swansea =

St Jude's Church (former)
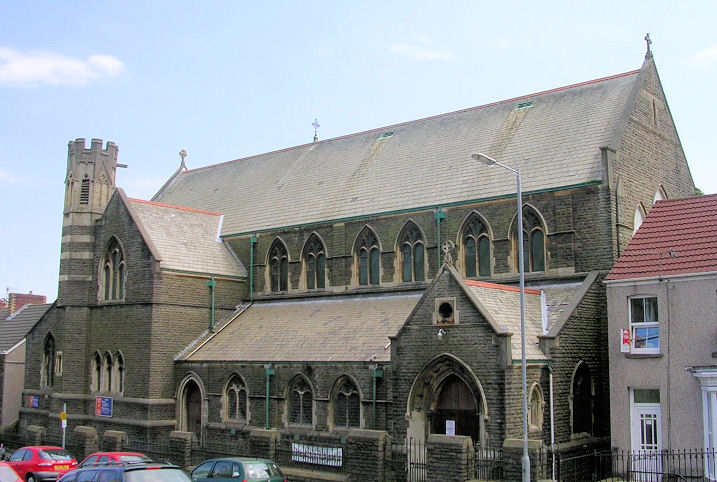
- The former St Jude's Church
- St Jude's Church (former)
- Address: Mount Pleasant, Swansea
- Country: Wales
- Previous denomination: Anglican

History
- Status: Church (former)
- Dedication: Saint Jude

Architecture
- Functional status: Abandoned
- Architect: E. M. Bruce Vaughan
- Architectural type: Church
- Years built: 1913–1915
- Closed: 8 February 2015

St Jude's Parish Church is a former Anglican church in Mount Pleasant, Swansea, Wales, in the United Kingdom. The final service was held on 8 February 2015, just a few months short of its centenary.

== History ==
The present building was designed by E. M. Bruce Vaughan, and built in the years 1913–1915, on the site of an earlier church constructed of galvanised iron. In 1924 a new daughter church was built at Townhill to serve the developing estates at this end of the parish. In 1937 the parish of St Nicholas Townhill was carved out of St Jude's to serve this area.

In 2015 both St Jude's and St Nicholas were merged to make The Benefice of Swansea St Nicholas on the Hill and St Jude. St Nicholas Church Townhill and St Judes's church closed.

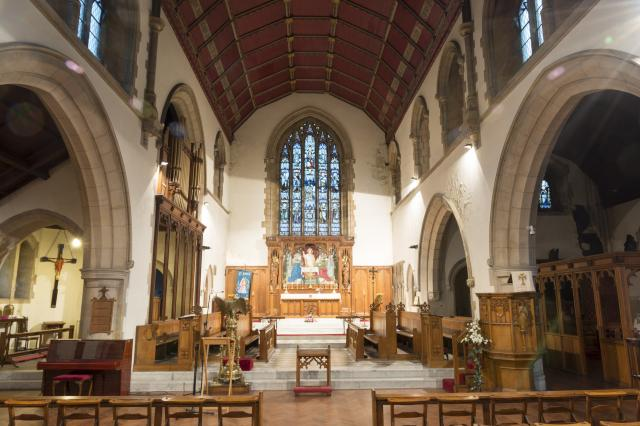
The nave
