= Habershon and Fawckner =

British architectural practice

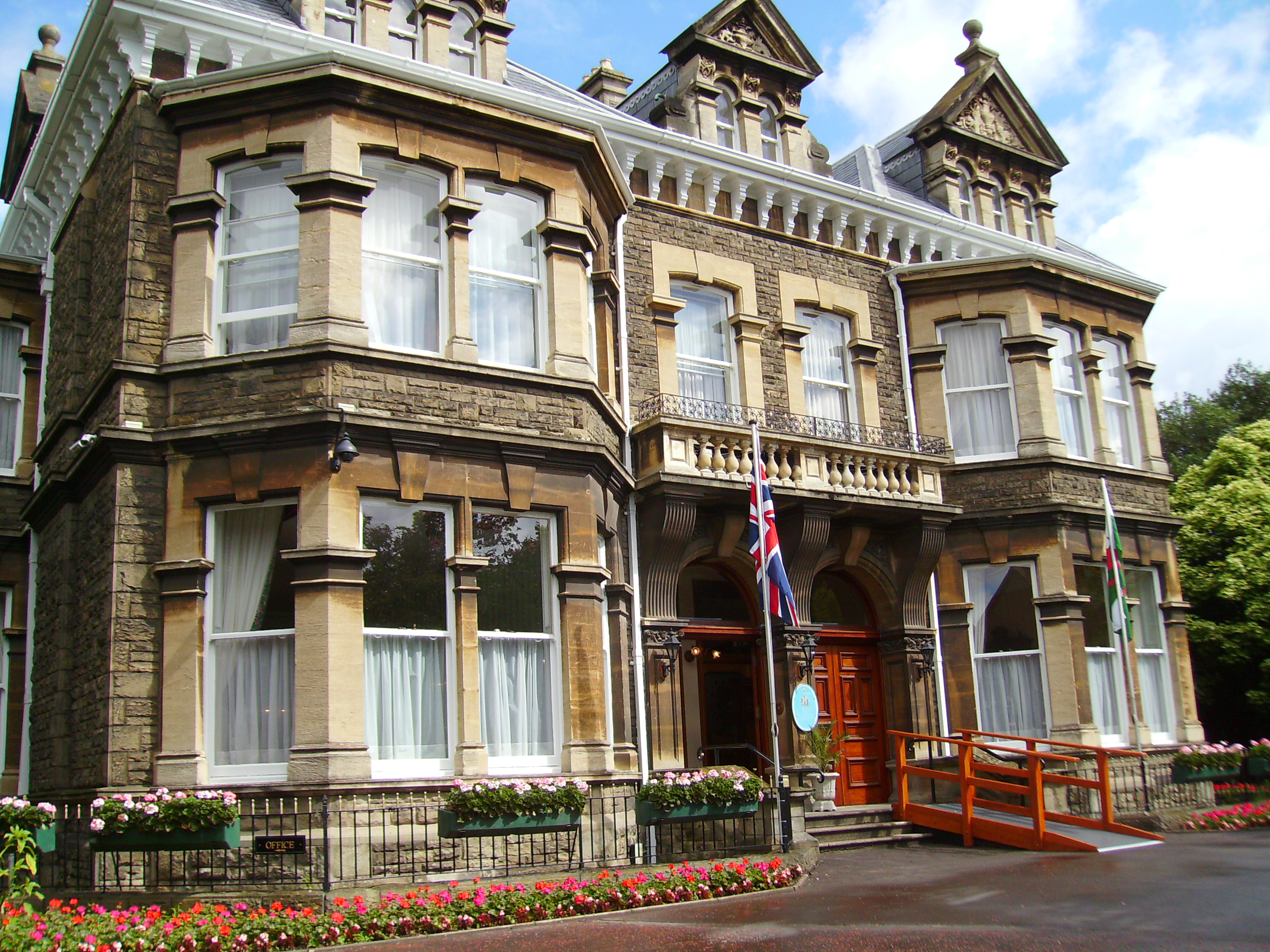
Mansion House (originally The Grove), Cardiff (1896)

Habershon & Fawckner or Habershon, Pite & Fawckner was a British architectural practice active in England and Wales from the 1860s, particularly in Cardiff and the South Wales area. They had had offices in London, Cardiff and Newport, designing a large number of houses, villas and non-conformist chapels.

== Background ==
William Gilbee Habershon (c.1818–1891) began practising in St Neots, Huntingdonshire in 1843, in partnership with his brother Edward. The brothers were the sons of the architect Matthew Habershon. Mathew Habershon, as well as working in London, had already established an office in Newport. By the time of their father's death in 1852, the two sons were practising from 38 Bloomsbury Square in London and presumably had inherited their father's practice. In 1852 William Habershon was elected an FRIBA and Edward an ARIBA. The partnership between the brothers was dissolved in 1863 and William Habershon formed a new partnership with one of his pupils, Alfred Robert Pite (b. 1832-1911). James Follet Fawckner (c.1828–1898) became a partner (though he was not a registered architect) in 1870 – he had been part of the Habershon company since 1857. After Pite retired aged 45, the practice continued as Habershon & Fawckner. The business had offices in London, Cardiff and Newport, Wales (W.G. & E. Habershon had previously run an office in High Street, Cardiff). The Newport office was run by Fawckner, who was probably responsible for the firms South Wales chapels. After Habershon's death in 1891 Fawckner became the senior partner.

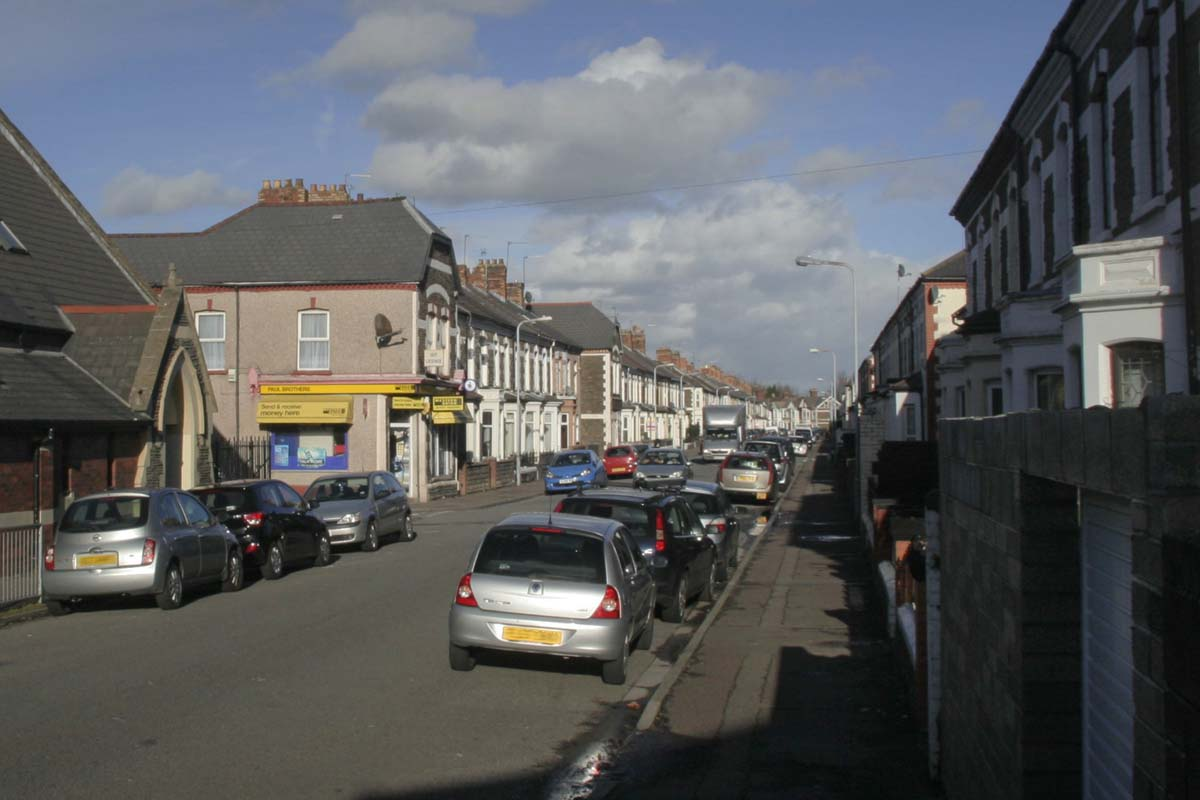
Habershon Street, Splott, Cardiff, named after William Habershon

The firm (preceded by W.G. & E. Habershon) were architects for the Tredegar Estate in South Wales. They laid out large parts of Cardiff with parallel streets of villas for the middle classes. They included the streets around The Parade, The Walk, Richmond Road and Richmond Crescent (now in Roath) named 'Tredegarville' at the time. Cardiff's working class residential area of Splott was laid out by Habershon & Fawckner between 1875 and 1899, with the firm basing themselves at the Tredegar Estate offices on Pearl Street. They were responsible for over 1700 houses. Habershon's name was given to Habershon Street, while Hinton Street may have been named after Fawckner's son, Edgar Hinton Fawckner.

The company was busy in Newport, building three Anglican churches and at least fourteen chapels between 1857 and 1907.

In 1891 Habershon & Fawckner designed a mansion on Richmond Crescent, Cardiff, named 'The Grove' (later 'The Mansion House' and home of the city mayor), for shop owner James Howell and family. The mansion included Roccoco detailing and an unusual double front entrance in case the house needed to be divided at a future date.

== Notable buildings ==
=== As Habershon & Pite ===
- Baptist Chapel, Stow Hill, Newport (1862–63)
- Presbyterian Church, Havelock Street, Newport (1864)
- Conway Road Methodist Church, Romilly Crescent, Canton, Cardiff (1869–71)
- Thomas Rotherham College, Moorgate Road, Rotherham (1874-1876)(originally built as Rotherham Congregational College; used by Rotherham Grammar School from c.1890 until c. 1971)
- Christ Church, Totland, Isle of Wight (1875)

=== As Habershon, Pite & Fawckner ===
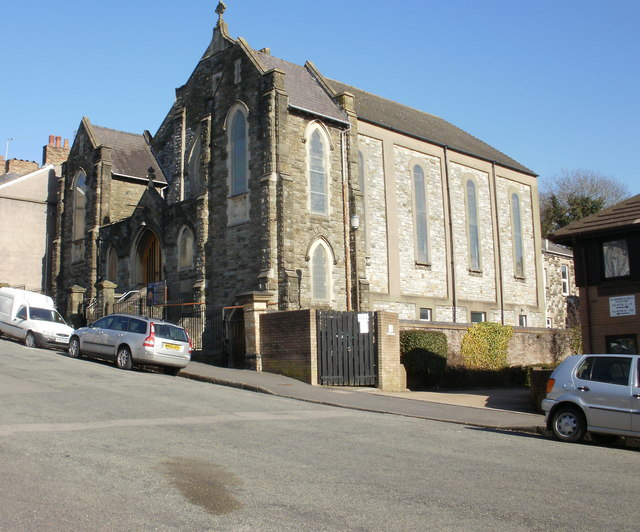
Summerhill Baptist Church, Albert Avenue, Newport

- Summerhill Baptist Church, Newport (1866)
- Brunswick Methodist Church, Swansea (1872–3)
- St Mark's Church, Gold Tops, Newport (1872–74) and Vicarage (1877)
- Beechwood House, Newport (1877–78), a mansion for former Mayor of Newport, George Fothergill.

=== As Habershon & Fawckner ===
- Church of St Basil, Bassaleg (1878–9) - restoration of a medieval church.
- St Paul, Brixton (1881), Santley Street, declared redundant in 1980 and became Seventh Day Adventist Church in 1981
- Bethel Methodist Church, Stow Hill, Newport (1882–83)
- Parc Hotel, Park Lane, Cardiff, 1884.
- 165 Commercial Street, Newport (1886)
- Talbot Tabernacle, Talbot Road, Kensington, London
- 31-33 Commercial Street, Newport (1889)

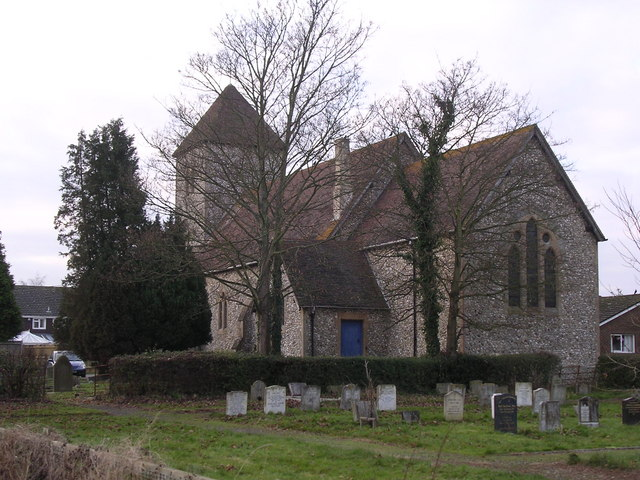
St Michael and All Angels Church, Partridge Green (1890)

- St Michael and All Angels Church, Partridge Green, West Grinstead, Sussex (1890–)
- Barry Market, Barry, Glamorgan (1890) (later used as a concert hall)
- Sunday Schools, Romilly Crescent, Cardiff (1891), accompanying the earlier Methodist Church
- 'The Grove', Richmond Crescent, Cardiff (1891–96)
- Splott Road Methodist Chapel, Splott, Cardiff (1896)

=== As Habershon, Fawckner & Groves ===
- Wesleyan Methodist Chapel, Commercial Road, Newport (1899)
- Clytha Primary School, Newport (1900–1)
- St Andrews United Reformed Church, Wellfield Road, Cardiff (1899–1901)
- Queen Victoria Memorial (almshouses), Stow Hill, Newport (1901–2)

=== As Habershon, Fawckner & Co. ===
- United Reformed Church, Pen-y-wain Road, Roath Park, Cardiff (1909–10)

== Sources ==
- Lloyd, David W.; Pevsner, Nikolaus (2006). The Isle of Wight. The Buildings of England. London: Yale University Press. ISBN 978-0-300-10733-3.
- Newman, John (1995), The Buildings of Wales: Glamorgan, Penguin Books, ISBN 0-14-071056-6
- Newman, John (2000), The Buildings of Wales: Gwent/Monmouthshire, Penguin Books, ISBN 0-14-071053-1
