= St James the Great, Cardiff =

Former church in Cardiff, Wales

Coordinates: 51.4846°N 3.1650°W

Church of St James the Great
- Eglwys Sant Iago Fawr
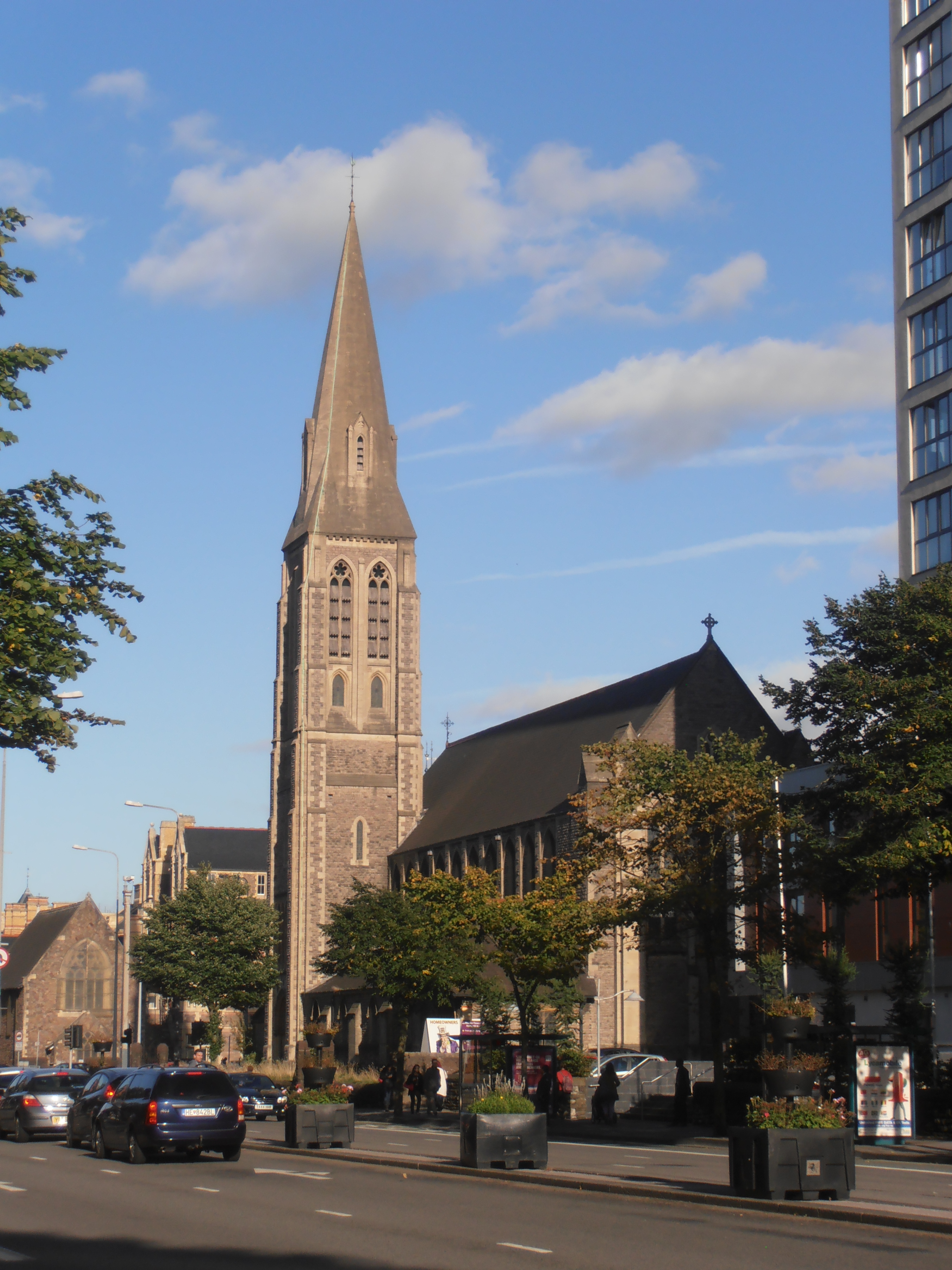
- Church of St James the Great

- Location within Cardiff

General information
- Location: Cardiff, Wales
- Construction started: 1890
- Completed: 1894

Design and construction
- Architect: E. M. Bruce Vaughan

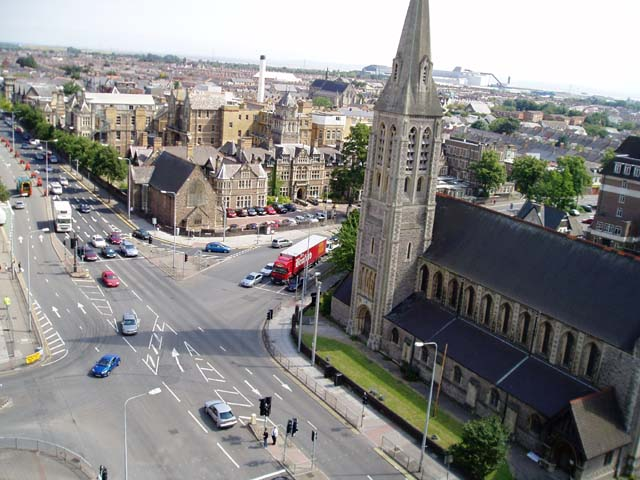

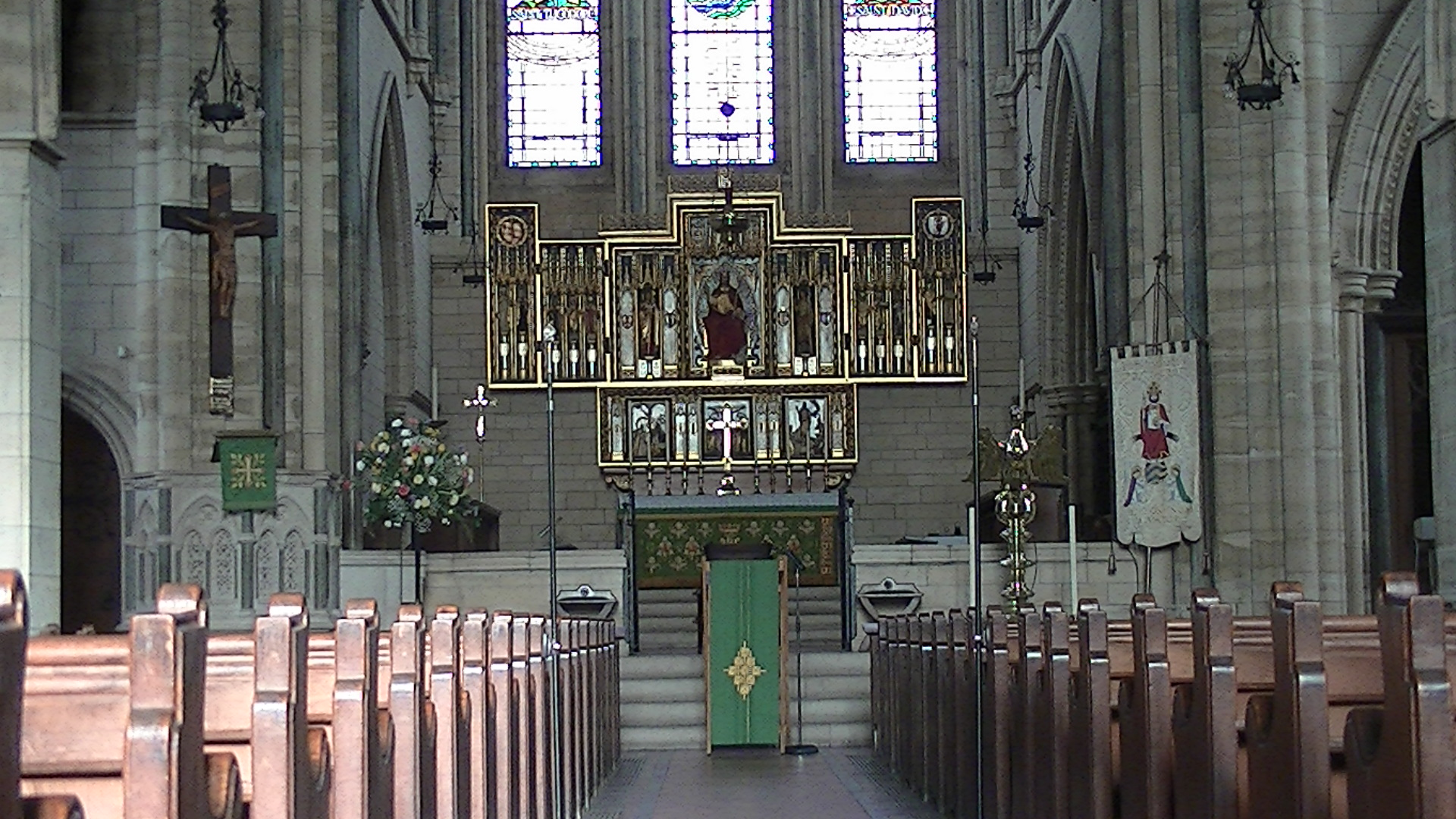
The reredos shown in its new location, St Theodore's Church, Port Talbot

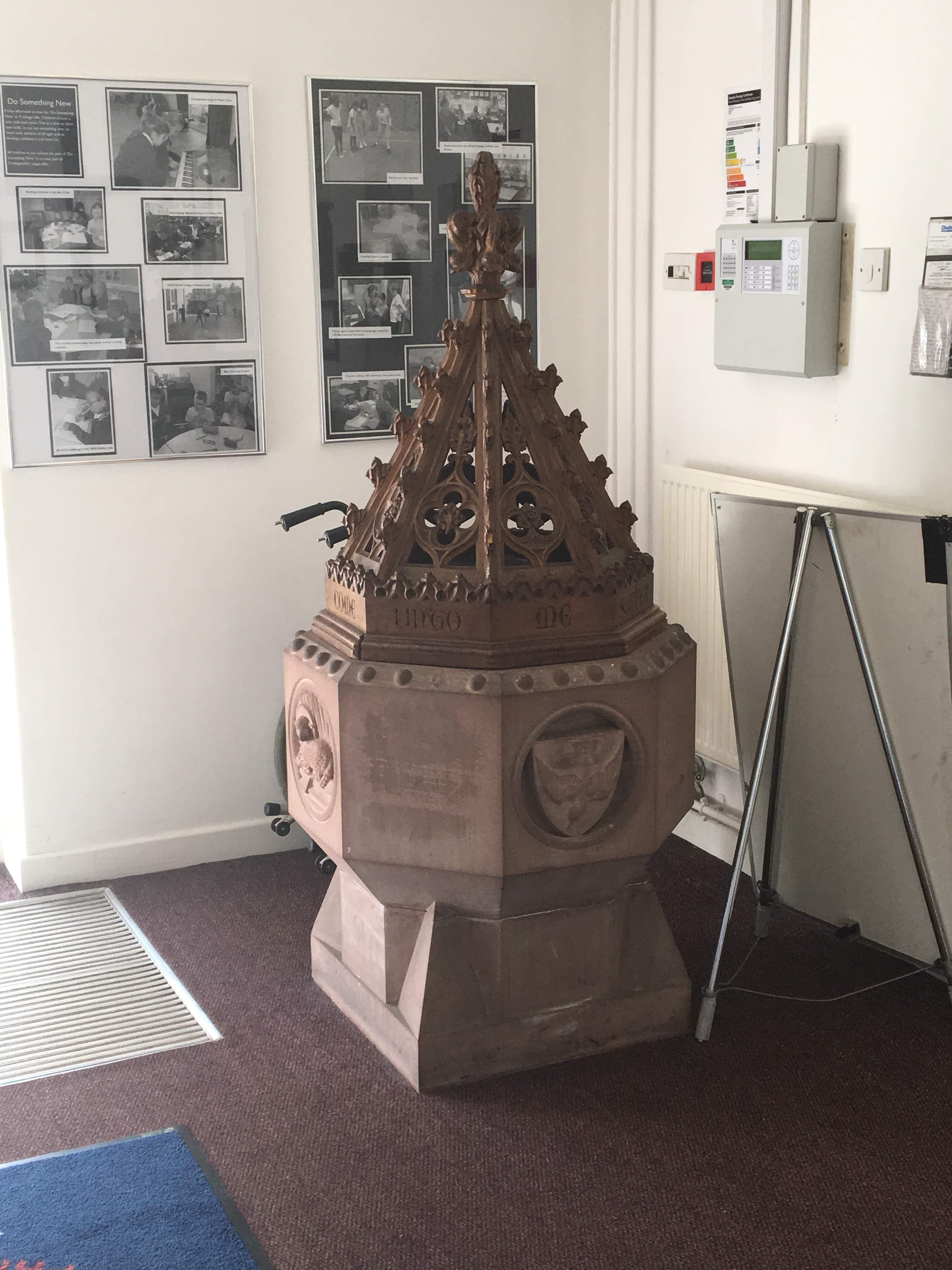
Baptismal font, shown in its new location in the entrance to Tredegarville Primary School

St James the Great (Welsh: Eglwys Sant Iago Fawr) is a church opposite the Cardiff Royal Infirmary on Newport Road, near the centre of Cardiff, Wales. It closed in 2006 after serving for 112 years as an Anglican place of worship.

== History and description ==
St James the Great was designed by the architect Colonel E. M. Bruce Vaughan. It was built between 1890 and 1894, replacing an earlier iron church. Bruce-Vaughan's church is described as his "major work" and took some inspiration from the nearby St German's Church in Adamsdown (particularly the high, wide chancel) but with the noticeable addition of a "finely composed" tower and spire. It cost a substantial £10,000 to complete. Externally, the church is finished with Sweldon limestone, Bath stone and ashlar while, internally, the nave pillars are alternately round and octagonal. The carved pulpit was "a sumptuous piece" in pink, green and buff coloured stone. The gilded and painted reredos screen was early 20th-century.

The church became a Grade II listed building in 1975.

The church closed in 2006 and was sold in 2007 by the Church in Wales for £500,000.

Important architectural fittings have been relocated, for example the font is now in the entrance hall of the next door Tredegarville Primary School and the reredos has been refitted to St Theodore's Church, Port Talbot.

== Conversion ==
Planning permission was granted in 2008 to create 12 one and two-bedroom flats and, in addition, a seven storey apartment in the church tower. A further planning application was submitted in 2014, to convert the building into 16 homes. The conversion was completed by Adapt Conversions, to designs by architect Andrew Shipley, with the church's original arches, columns and stained glass windows incorporated into the apartments. Three show homes were opened for viewing in 2022, with the 16 unique units being put up for sale.

== See also ==
- Architecture of Cardiff
