= West Grove, Cardiff =

Road in Cardiff, Wales

Coordinates: 51.4485°N 3.169°W

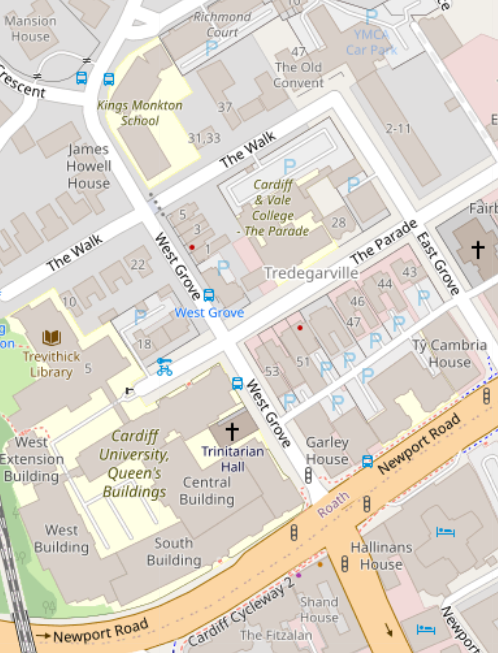
Map of West Grove in Cardiff

West Grove is a road in Roath, Cardiff, Wales. It is situated off Newport Road. The Queen's Buildings of Cardiff University, Kings Monkton School and the former West Grove Unitarian Church are all located in West Grove. The Mansion House is officially in Richmond Road, but it is at the extreme end of West Grove and dominates the northern end.

== History ==
West Grove was one of the villa-lined roads that formed the wealthy residential district of Tredegarville, laid out for the Tredegar Estate during the third quarter of the nineteenth century.

== Important buildings on West Grove ==
=== Grade II listed structures with the official names ===
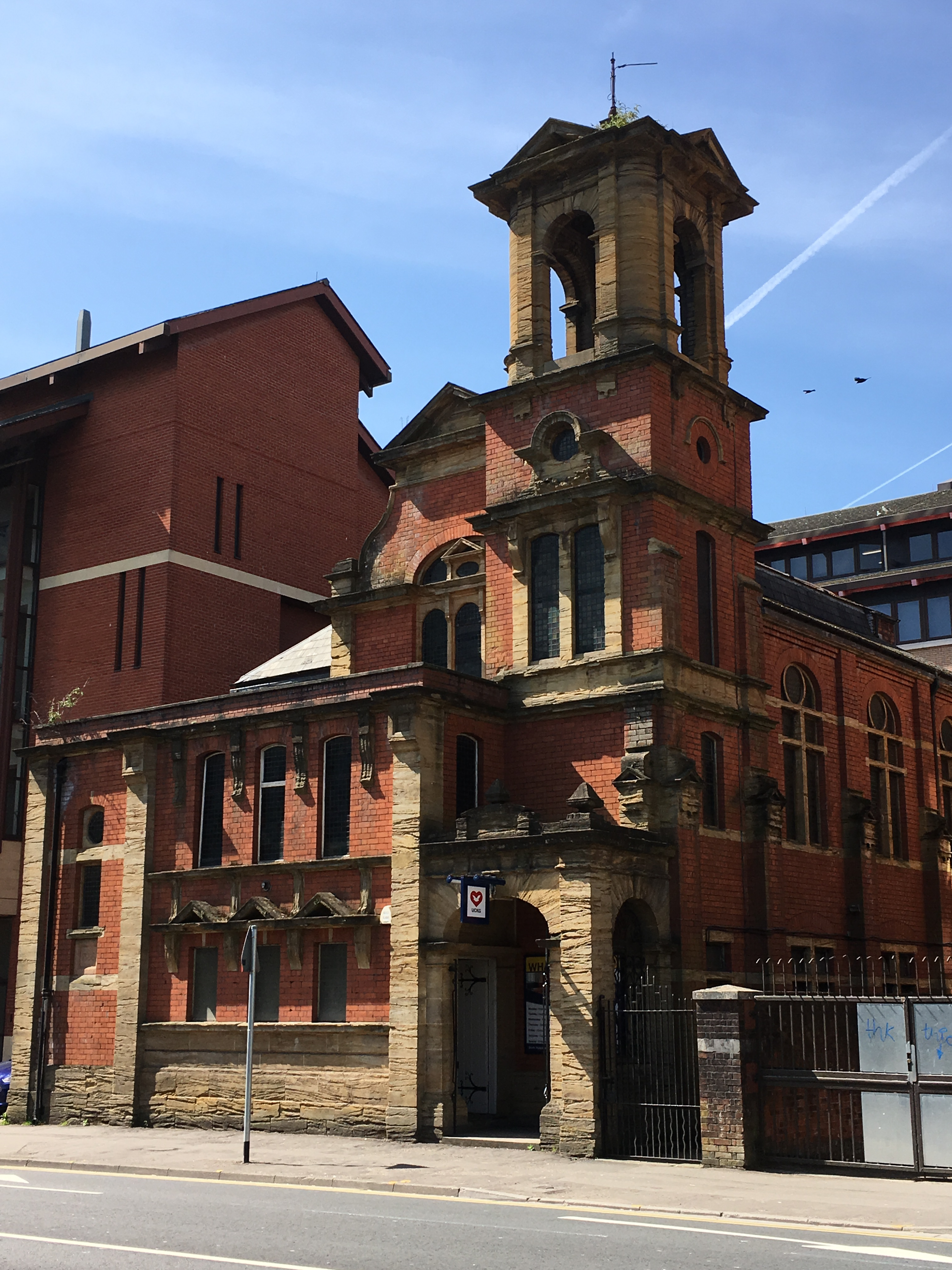
(former) Unitarian Church

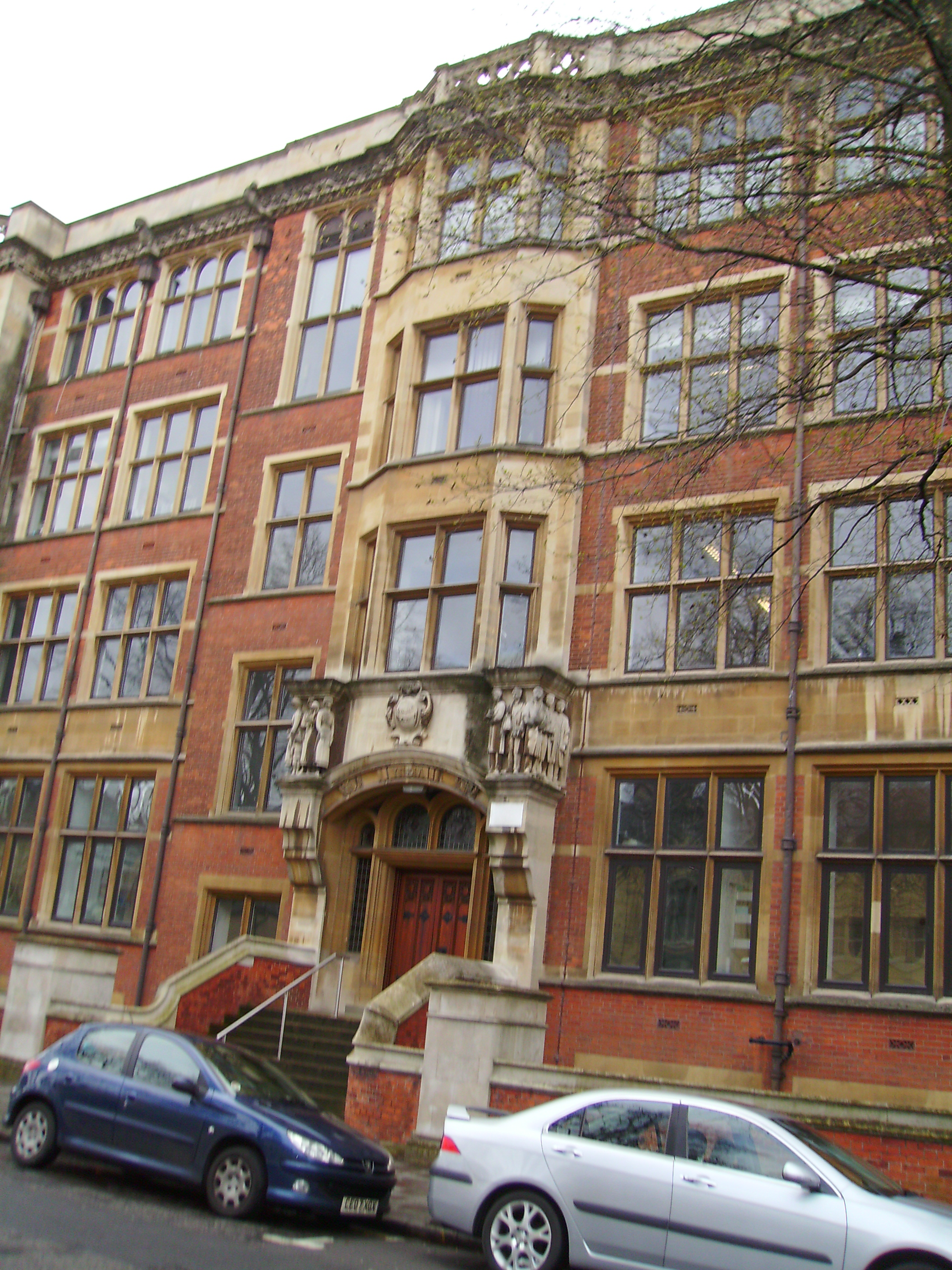
Public Analyst's Laboratory, Queen's Building, Cardiff University

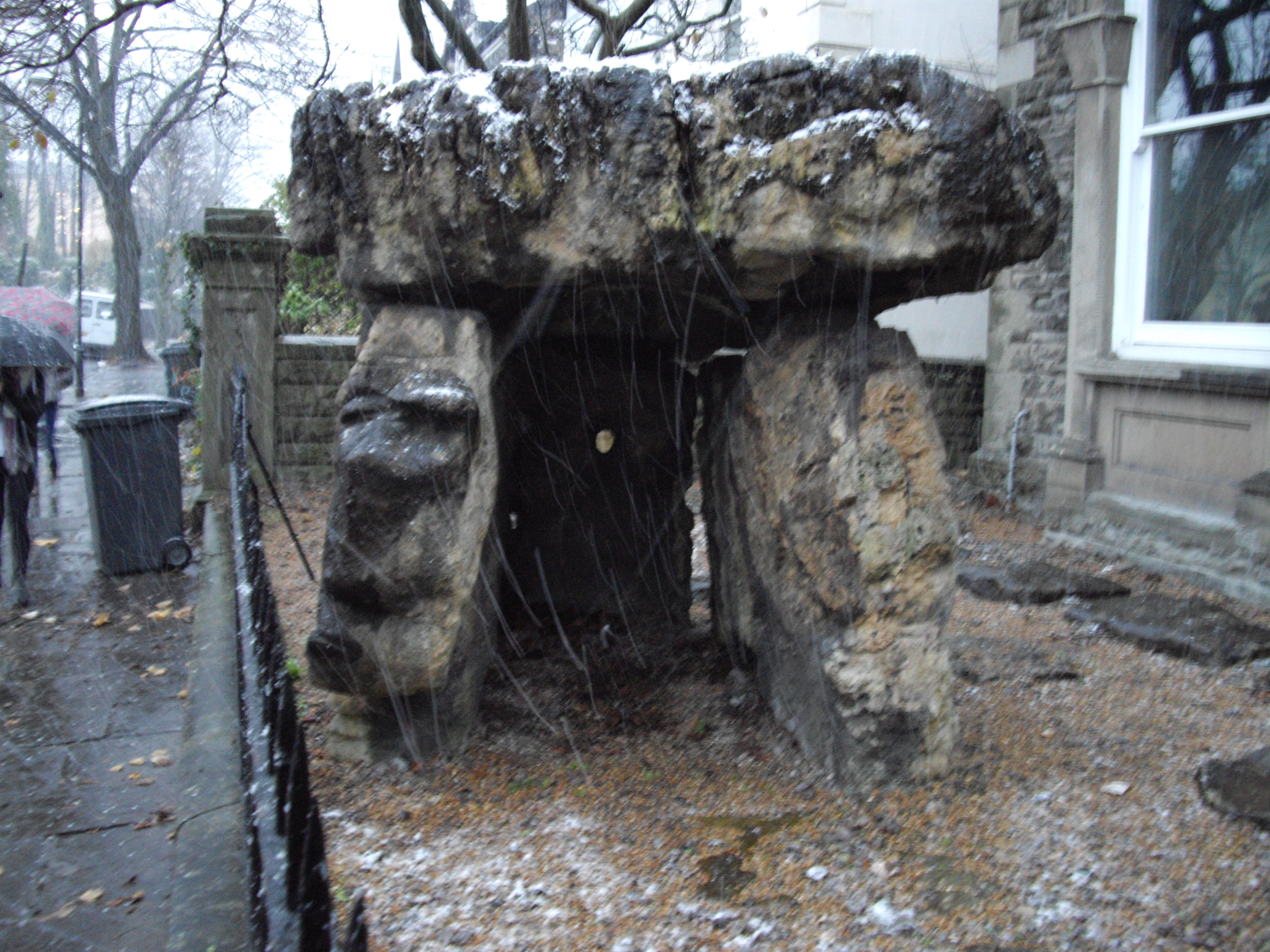
Megalithic folly at James Howell House

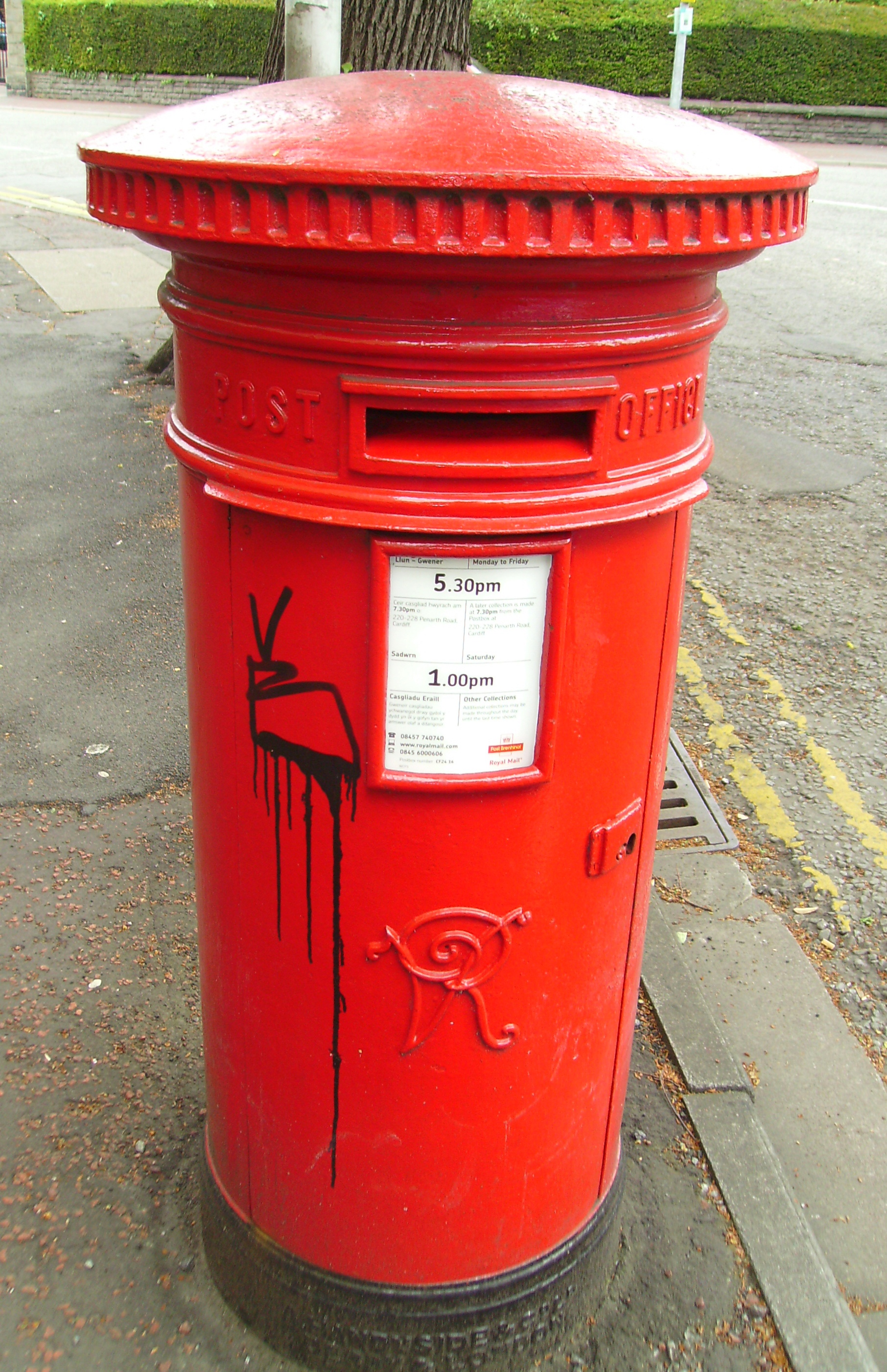
Pillar Box in West Grove

=== Other important buildings ===
Views of West Grove

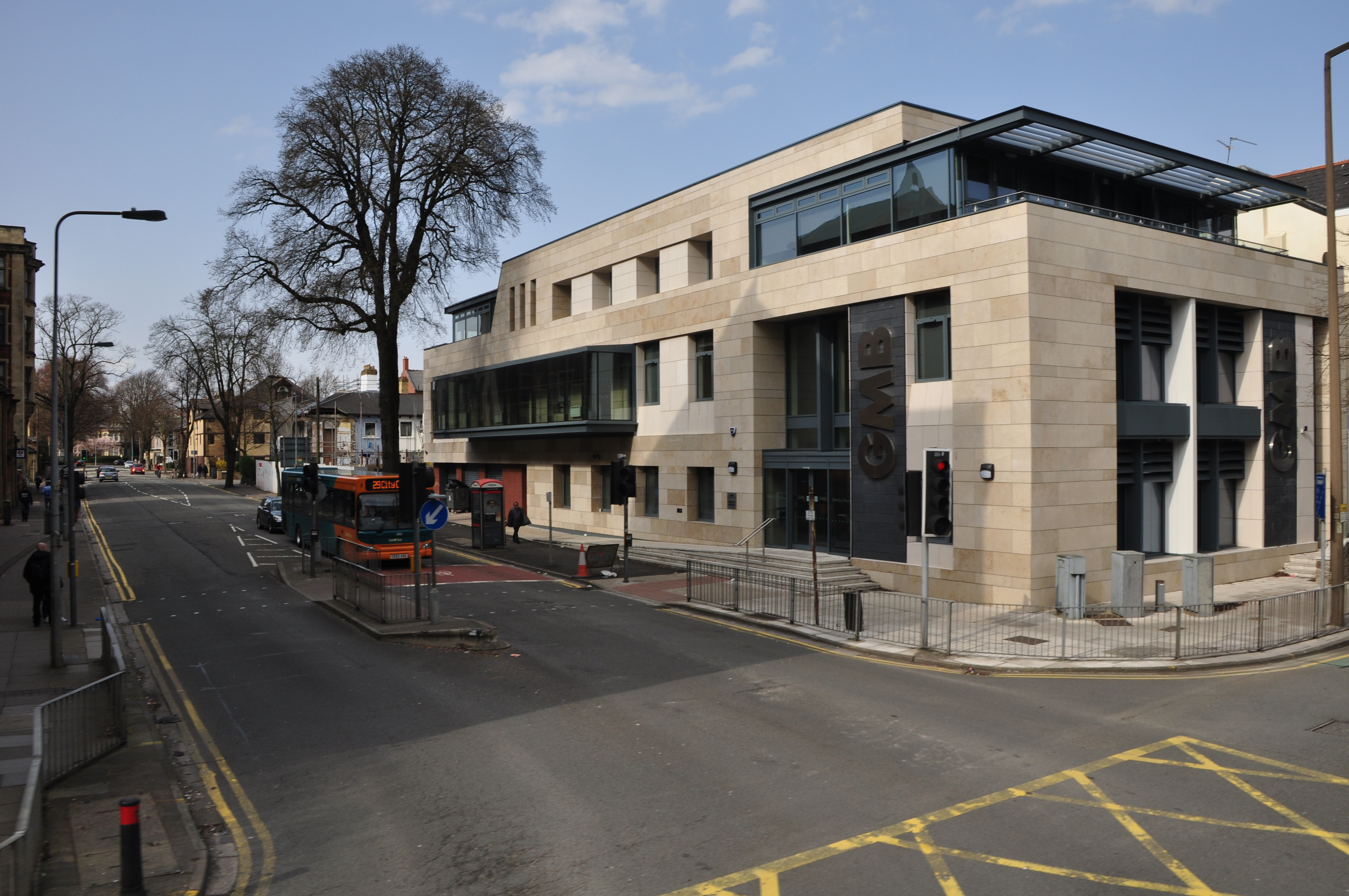
Looking north from the junction of Newport Road. Garley House on the right is home to the regional head office of the GMB trade union

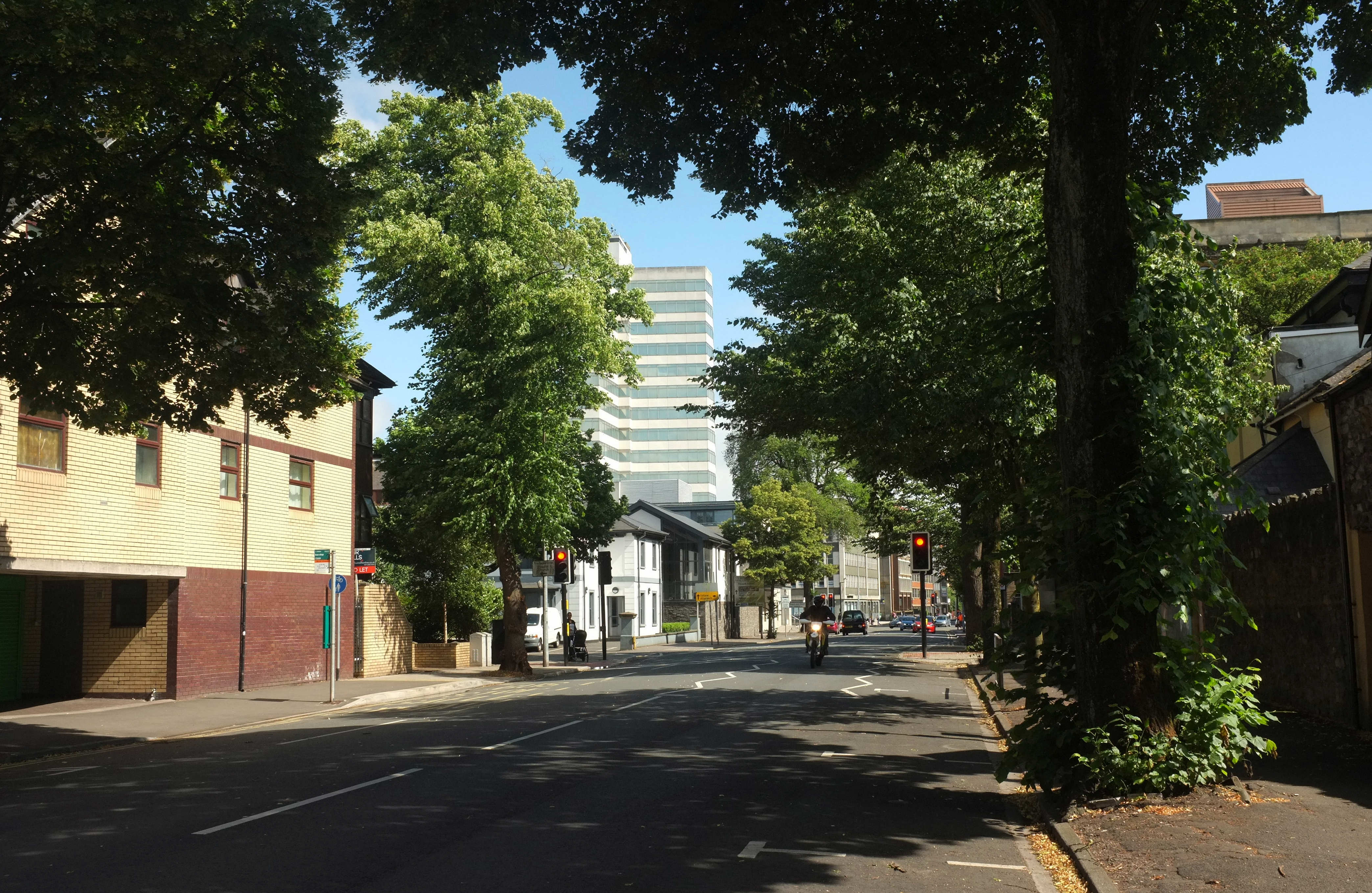
Looking south from the junction of Richmond Road.

Kings Monkton School was established in 1870, and is an independent day school.

The GMB trade union has its Wales & South West regional office at Garley House.

== See also ==
- Transport in Cardiff
