= Mansion House, Cardiff =

Building in Cardiff, Wales

Mansion House
- Y Plasty

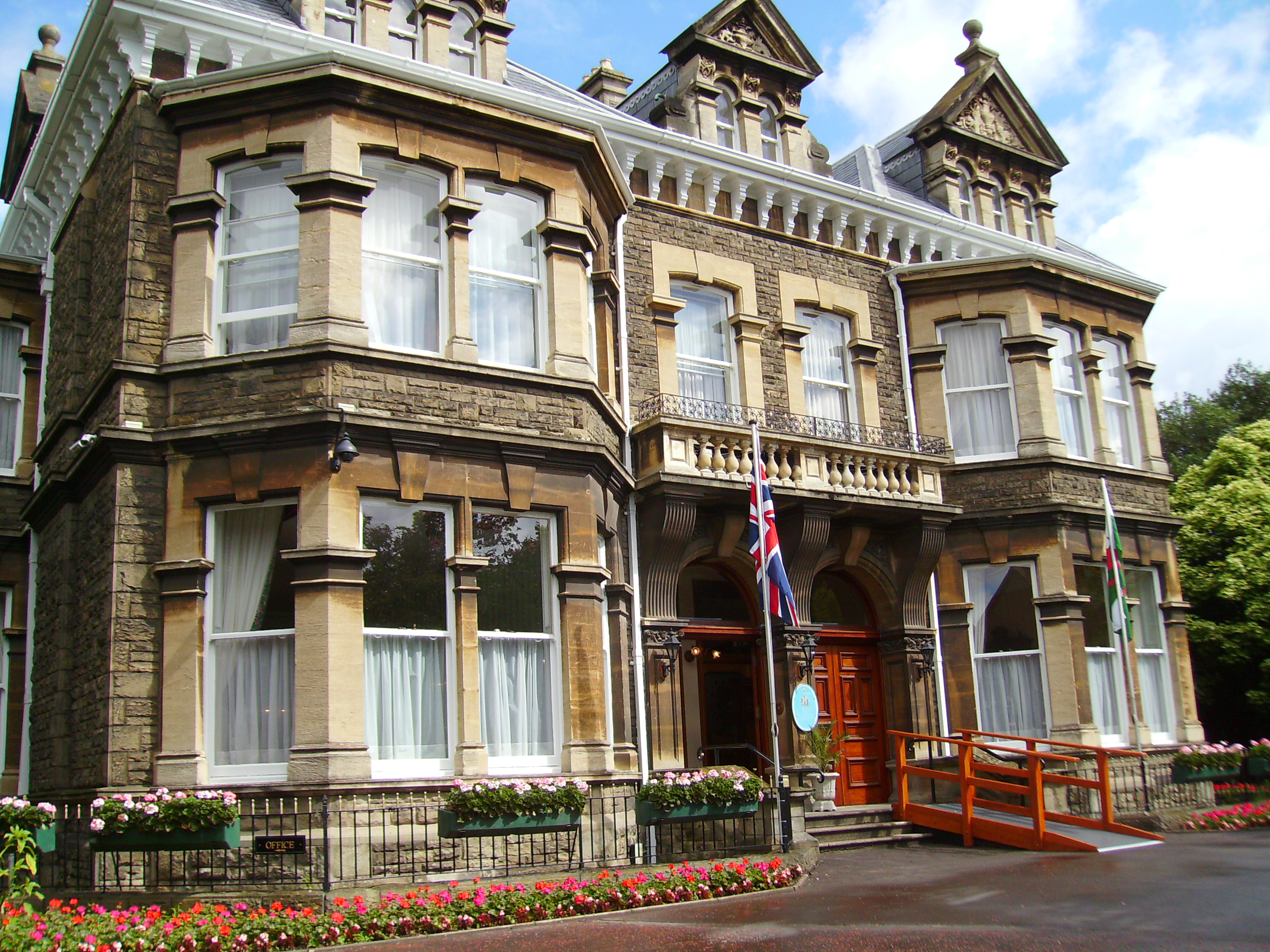
- Mansion House in 2008
- Interactive map of the Mansion House area
- Former names: The Grove

General information
- Architectural style: Neo-Baroque style
- Location: Richmond Road, Roath CF24 3UN, Cardiff, Wales
- Coordinates: 51.4862°N 3.1706°W

Technical details
- Floor count: 2

Design and construction
- Architecture firm: Habershon and Fawckner

Website
- mansionhousecardiff.co.uk

Listed Building – Grade II
- Official name: The Mansion House
- Designated: 24 May 2002; 24 years ago
- Reference no.: 26661

The Mansion House (Welsh: Y Plasty), located on Richmond Road in Cardiff, was the official residence of the Lord Mayor of Cardiff until 1995. It was listed Grade II by Cadw in May 2002.

== History ==
The house was commissioned by James Howell, the owner of Howells department store, who opened his first shop in 1865. He selected a site on Richmond Road which he leased from Lord Tredegar in 1890. The house was designed by the architects Habershon & Fawckner in the Neo-Baroque style, built in rubble masonry and was completed in 1896. It was originally called 'The Grove'.

The house was designed as a large family home, to house his 11 children. The design involved a symmetrical main frontage of four bays facing onto Richmond Road. An unusual aspect of the house was that it was designed to be able to be divided into two: it featured two round-headed front doors, with a balcony above, and a wall in the cellar which was designed to allow extension upwards. The outer bays have bay windows on both floors. At roof level, there was a modillioned cornice and there were three dormer windows.

Residents at the house in the early 20th century included Mabel Howell (a daughter of James Howell), who was secretary of the Cardiff and District Women's Suffrage Society.

In 1913, the leasehold of the house was bought by the Cardiff Corporation, for use as the home of the lord mayors. Internally, it featured two apartments on the first floor and these were also used by judges sitting in the city. The Prince of Wales met civic leaders at the mansion house during a visit to Cardiff in May 1930. In 1956, the freehold of the property was bought by the Cardiff Corporation's under the advice of their Civic Buildings Committee for £3000 from the Tredegar Estate, most of which was being disposed of at this time in lieu of death-duties. The house continued to be used by successive lord mayors until 1995.

The building had a major overhaul in time for the Cardiff European Council summit held on 15 and 16 June 1998. It was then used by Cardiff Council for events, functions, civil ceremonies and weddings. It also became the base for the council's protocol team.

The actress, Catherine Zeta-Jones, and her husband, Michael Douglas, visited the mansion house, in July 2010, for the launch of the Noah's Ark Children's Hospital for Wales appeal of which she is a patron. Scenes from the BBC television series, Doctor Who, starring Ncuti Gatwa, were shot at the mansion house in October 2023.

The council ceased to use the mansion for civic purposes in the 2020s, and put it up for sale in June 2025.

== See also ==
- West Grove, Cardiff
- List of mayors of Cardiff
