= Phyllis Maud Performance Space =

Historic building in Newport, Wales

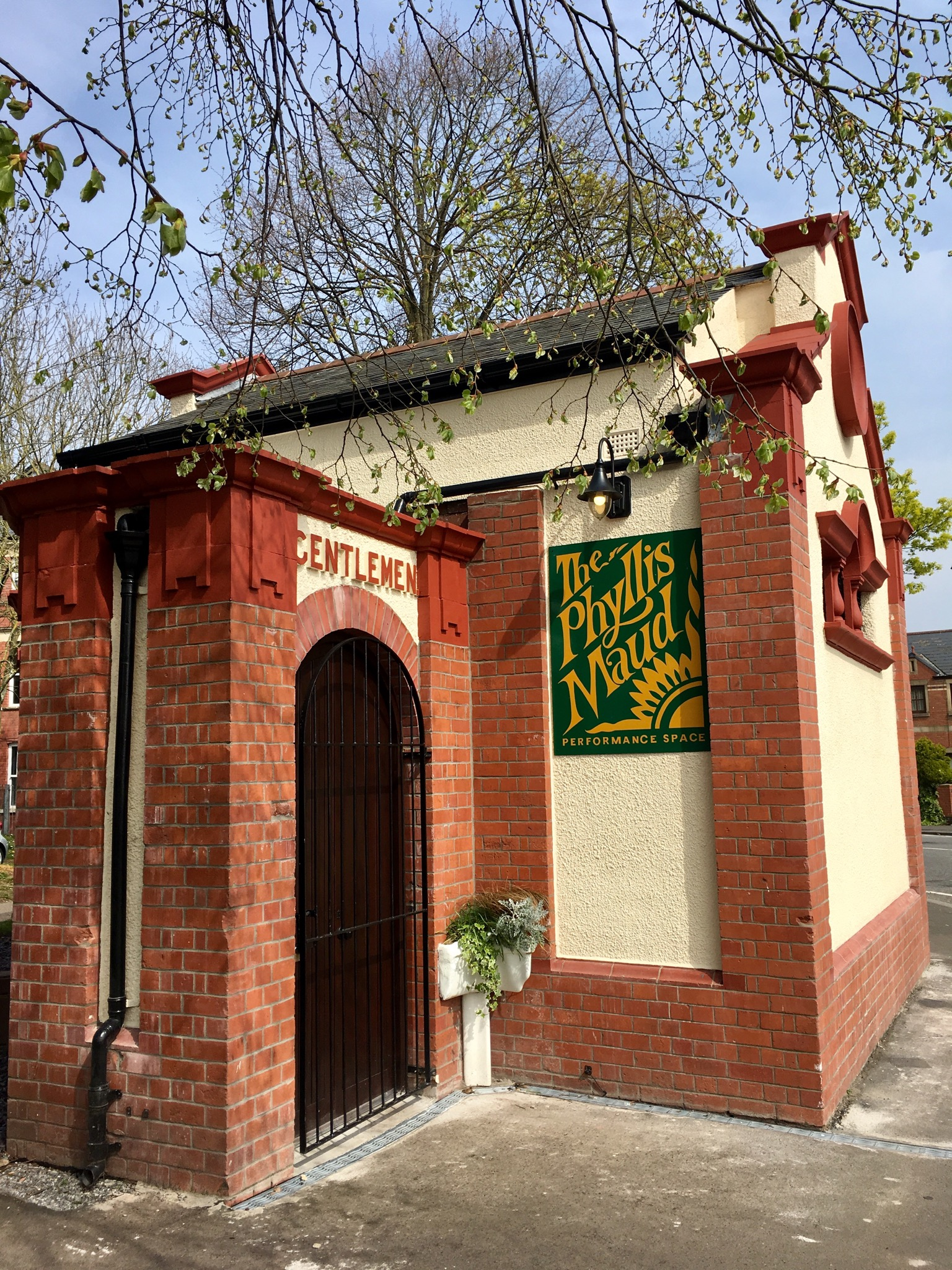
- The Phyllis Maud Performance Space in April 2019
- Interactive map of Phyllis Maud Performance Space
- Address: Alexandra Road; Newport; Wales
- Coordinates: 51.575421°N 2.987553°W
- Owner: Janet Martin
- Capacity: 25–35
- Type: Non-profit producing theatre
- Designation: Grade II listed

Construction
- Opened: 2019; 7 years ago
- Rebuilt: 2018
- Years active: 2019 – present

The Phyllis Maud Performance Space is a Grade II listed former public toilet in Newport, South Wales.

== History ==
The building ceased to operate as a public convenience in 2006. In September 2017, the former public toilet on Alexandra Road was sold at auction for £31,500 to a bidder who planned to turn the building into a cafe. However, the successful bidder then pulled out, and Janet Martin subsequently purchased the building from the council for £15,000.

In June 2018 the local council approved plans to convert the space into a 25-seat theatre, which they considered would be a positive addition to an area "in need of both physical and social regeneration". Janet Martin decided to name the venue after her late aunt.

Owner Janet Martin is also responsible for other arts venues including the Robbins Lane Studios and Barnabas Arts House. The venue opened in April 2019. The opening was attended by around 100 people.
