= Caerleon Roman Fortress and Baths =

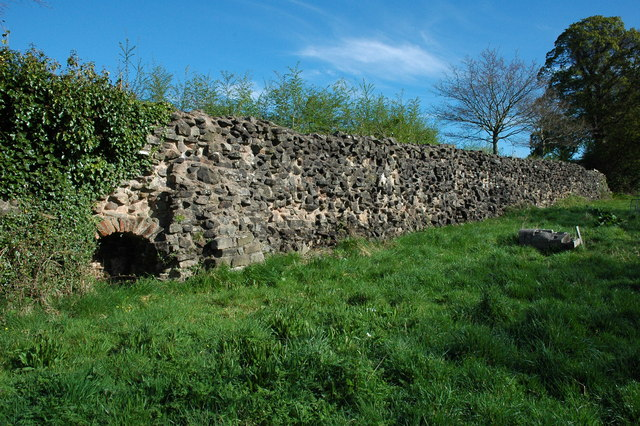

- Museum location in Newport, Wales Caerleon Roman Fortress and Baths (the United Kingdom) Caerleon Roman Fortress and Baths (Europe)
- Location: Caerleon, Newport, Wales
- Coordinates: 51.61005°N 2.95529°W
- Type: Archaeological museum
- Owner: Cadw
- Website: Caerleon Roman Fortress and Baths

Caerleon Roman Fortress and Baths encompass the archaeological ruins and sites of the Legionary Fortress of Isca Augusta spread across the town of Caerleon, near the city of Newport, South Wales. Notable for being one of only three permanent legionary fortresses from Roman Britain (the others being York and Chester), Caerleon has provided a unique opportunity to study the archaeology of a Roman Legionary fortress, less affected by the medieval and subsequent urban activity of most such fortresses. Having attracted the attention of eminent archaeologists throughout the 20th century it now has four major public archaeological venues, including the museum run by Cadw, called 'Caerleon Roman Fortress and Baths' (Welsh: Caer a Baddonau Rhufeinig Caerllion), featuring the excavated fortress bath-house. Also open to the public is the most complete excavated amphitheatre in Britain, a series of barracks and the National Roman Legion Museum. The fortress and its surrounding civil settlement have been the subject of continuing major archaeological investigations into the 21st century.

== Background and history ==
Roman Wales was the farthest point west that the Roman Empire in Britain extended to, and as a defence point, the fortress at Caerleon built in AD 75 was one of only three permanent Roman Legionary fortresses in Roman Britain. It was occupied and operational for just over 200 years.

Map of modern-day Caerleon, showing the line of the walls of the Roman Legionary Fortress of Isca Augusta.
Red dots are sites open to the public, blue dots are other scheduled monuments within the fortress. Green dots are scheduled sites of the civil settlement (canabae).
1 Roman Fortress Baths (Museum)
2 Caerleon Amphitheatre
3 National Roman Legion Museum
4 Area of excavated Roman Barracks
5 Barracks in the area of Myrtle Cottage
6 Barrack blocks in the former garden of The Firs
7 Area behind Caerleon House: site of the Porta Praetoria, the main entrance to the fortress.
8 Area off White Hart Lane: Officers quarters and SW Barrack Blocks
9 Area between Priory Hotel and Priory Lodge, identified as tribune houses and military warehouses
10 Back garden of No 4 Museum Street, with a tribune's house, section of road and the north end of the Bath complex
11 Site of the residence of the primus pilus, the senior centurion of the legion, in the grounds of the endowed school.
12 Site of domestic structures identified as tribunes' houses, fronting onto the road now called Broadway
13 Large building thought to be iron-working workshops under the primary school playing fields
14 Old Vicarage garden: site of the central courtyard and basilica of the headquarters (principa) of the Roman fortress
15 Town Hall Park: possible location of the Praetorium, the residence of the legate
16 Barracks block site in the grounds of the health clinic
17 Goldcroft Common Barracks block site
18 Grounds of the nursing home: continuation of the NE Barracks buildings
19 Grounds of St Cadoc's Church: unexcavated site probably with workshops or graneries
20 Part of the canabae at the former ambulance station field
21 Canabae (Caerleon civil settlement)
22 Caerleon civil settlement: area under Broadway playing fields
23 Roman extra-mural baths under the bailey of the medieval castle
24 Caerleon civil settlement: site of Roman building southeast of Castle Street

== Archaeological research ==
The earliest description of Caerleon's Roman ruins is in Gerald of Wales's 12th century Itinerarium Cambriae. He was fully aware of the Roman historical significance of Caerleon and also gives extensive archaeological detail. Much may be fanciful or drawn from other locations however, and the features were certainly not apparent by later centuries. But his description confirmed Caerleon as a notable historical site:

Caerleon means the city of Legions, Caer, in the British language, signifying a city or camp, for there the Roman legions, sent into this island, were accustomed to winter, and from this circumstance it was styled the city of legions. This city was of undoubted antiquity, and handsomely built of masonry, with courses of bricks, by the Romans. Many vestiges of its former splendour may yet be seen; immense palaces, formerly ornamented with gilded roofs, in imitation of Roman magnificence, inasmuch as they were first raised by the Roman princes, and embellished with splendid buildings; a tower of prodigious size, remarkable hot baths, relics of temples, and theatres, all inclosed within fine walls, parts of which remain standing. You will find on all sides, both within and without the circuit of the walls, subterraneous buildings, aqueducts, underground passages; and what I think worthy of notice, stoves contrived with wonderful art, to transmit the heat insensibly through narrow tubes passing up the side walls.

There are further indications that significant ruins or building survived into the medieval period. The vast stone complex of the fortress baths are thought to have been destroyed in the 13th century, and the ditch at 10 Mill Street was identified as still standing open in the Middle Ages. An engraving of 1783 shows a crumbling tower and Roman stonework.

=== Antiquarians ===
Through the 1840s some ad hoc excavations were made, which, along with finds from construction works culminated in the foundation of the Caerleon Antiquarian Association in October 1847, with the twin aims of carrying out excavations and providing a museum to house the finds. An early project, possibly even predating the new Association was an excavation of the extramural bathhouse. This was alongside the medieval castle motte, within its bailey, on land owned by John Jenkins and it was undertaken by John Edward Lee, who became the secretary and initial driving force of the association.

New finds from Lee's excavation along with finds from construction work on a (never completed) railway cutting gave urgency to the idea of a museum. An early plan was to lease an old market building owned by Sir Digby Mackworth, 4th Baronet and the first chairman of the association. The building incorporated 4 Roman pillars and when this building was deemed an impracticable location it was demolished and the pillars given for re-use inside a new building on a new site. The museum opened to the public in the summer of 1850, to display the recently found artefacts along with many items donated by the townspeople. It would eventually be expanded and become the National Roman Legionary Museum. Limited resources and structural difficulties meant all the society's efforts were rapidly taken up with the museum leaving little energy for further archaeological work.

Lee also produced a catalogue of the museum contents, and added a first attempt at a history of the fortress.

In the 1890s the Bristol-based Clifton Antiquarian Club began excavating at nearby Caerwent and this had the effect of raising the profile of Roman archaeology in Monmouthshire as a whole.

In the 1900s, another outside body, the 'Liverpool Committee for Excavation and Research in Wales and the Marches' began a program of excavations led by Robert Carr Bosanquet, including a corner turret of the fortress walls, a building near the Church, and in 1908 a preliminary excavation of the Amphitheatre, revealing some well-preserved walls and buttresses.

=== Archaeologists ===
1926-27: Amphitheatre: since 1913 there had been a 'Caerleon Amphitheatre Fund', although it is unclear if this was a local initiative to try and get national funds or an external initiative to circumvent local inaction. However, after the 1914-18 war it reformed as the 'Caerleon Excavation Committee' and gained momentum under the leadership of Mortimer Wheeler, recently appointed director the National Museum of Wales. It was able to acquire the amphitheatre site, and in 1926 work began on removing 30,000 tons of soil. Over 14 months, and under three different supervisors, they were able to expose the whole of the original flooring, entrances, retaining walls and banks of seating areas. First supervisor was V. E. Nash-Williams, who had worked with Mortimer Wheeler at Segontium. Myers took over for 4 months, and for the remaining 8 months it was supervised by T. C. Wheeler, Mortimer's wife. When the work was completed the site was presented to the Office of Works for preservation as a national monument.

1927-29: Prysg Field was purchased by the Caerleon Excavation Committee and digs over three summers under V. E. Nash-Williams revealed the western corner ramparts and extensive barracks blocks. Following the example of the amphitheatre, the Barracks footings (and reconstructed ground plans) were laid out as public parkland on completion of the excavations.

1929: 'The Mount': Christopher Hawkes (also a veteran of the Segontium dig) began an excavation at 'The Mount', acquired that year by Col Atwood Thorne, and made available to the Excavation Committee. This revealed the ramparts at the eastern corner

The two 1920s digs confirmed what was until then considered to be a conjectural line for the fortress walls and established a construction sequence of a 75 AD ditch with clay rampart, which was faced with stone 25 years later and had a continued occupation until the end of the third century. The Western Barracks buildings had been exposed and showed that the original timber barracks were replaced by stone, around 115 AD.

In 1930 the Caerleon Antiquarian Association agreed to lend, and subsequently hand over, their museum to the National Museum of Wales, having devoted 80 years to keeping the troublesome roof repaired. In 1987 the museum building was almost entirely demolished, retaining just the classical portico. In its place, and built of glass, steel and concrete, is the new and significantly expanded National Roman Legion Museum. In 2018 the building had to close for 13 months while essential roof repairs were carried out.

=== Post-war study ===
The 1970s saw a new wave of archaeological activity, culminating in the 1977 to 1981 excavation of the fortress baths by J. David Zienkiewicz. It is believed that the baths complex was the only stone-built building in the new fortress of 75 AD, which was otherwise timber-built initially. Although initially a rescue dig, significant parts of the Baths site were preserved in situ, and were first opened to the public in 1980 in the care of Cadw as a public archaeological attraction.

In the years 1984-90 the focus shifted outside the walls of the fortress to excavate areas of the canabae, the civil settlement that had grown up around the fortress. There had long been an awareness of extramural buildings, and some of the earliest excavations had looked at the medieval castle site, near the south-east gates. Property developments at an extensive site alongside Mill Street, on the north-east side of the fortress, provided an opportunity for more up to date archaeological methods to investigate the area and consider the status of the canabae as a whole. Led by Edith Evans, it demonstrated that the civil settlement was more extensive and varied than once thought. With the nearby town of Caerwent, plus civil settlements at Usk and Bulmore it was part of a settled romanised landscape, and over several centuries became a substantial garrison town. It was not promoted to regional capital status, as happened at York, but from the limited evidence available at both British and other examples, Caerleon's civil settlement in the 2nd and 3rd centuries would have looked recognisably comparable to most such fortress canabae.

In a long-established chronology for the fortress it was assumed the military had departed by the end of the third century. Mounting evidence of fourth century occupation was considered by Edith Evans in a wide-ranging review of 2004. She suggested a case for a reformed and reduced legionary presence into the fourth century, but stressed that the three options (Smaller fort, Smaller garrison or Civilian use only) were all possible explanations of the limited archaeological evidence.

From 2007 to 2010 Andrew Gardner of UCL and Peter Guest of Cardiff University led joint summer research and training excavations on Priory Field, in the south-west section of the fortress alongside a geophys survey of the open ground south and west of the fortress. The excavations focussed on a large square building fronting onto Broadway, that appears to have had Legionary storage functions. Built early in the fortress's history, it collapsed or was demolished around 350, and the 2010 excavation unearthed thousands of finds including entire sets of Roman armour. A stone inscription was found that recorded that the building had been constructed by Flavius Rufus, possibly a first-generation Roman citizen who had risen to be Primus Pilus, the first ranked centurian of the II Augustan Legion. Cottages subsequently built on the same site were then occupied from 400 to 650 AD, revealing more of Caerleon's post-Legionary occupation.

In 2011 Peter Guest led a follow-up investigation of the area ('the Southern Canabae') between the Amphitheatre and the river Usk. The earlier geophysical survey had identified substantial structures south of the amphitheatres, which were examined using test trenches. They confirmed the location of a port fronting (and in places eroded by) the River Usk - only the second Roman Port known in Britain, the other being London. They also found three huge public buildings arranged around vast central courtyards. The largest was 150 metres (490 ft) by 120 metres (390 ft) with a central courtyard bigger than the area of the amphitheatre. The dig was featured in an episode of Time Team in 2012. The 'southern canabae' area appears to have been abandoned much earlier than the fortress. By the end of the 2nd century buildings were just being used to dump rubbish, so whatever its early functions, they ceased to be relevant within 125 years of the troops first arriving. Analysis of the finds and excavations is still ongoing, but interim suggestions on the nature and purpose of these buildings indicate they could have been built in the very earliest phase of the fortress, although on a different alignment than the fortress walls. The test trenches leave most of the site unsampled, so the interpretation is necessarily uncertain. Amongst the possibilities considered, the buildings may have related to the administration of the legion or the area, and the courtyards might have been assembly yards for troops and animals arriving at the port.

== Roman Baths ==
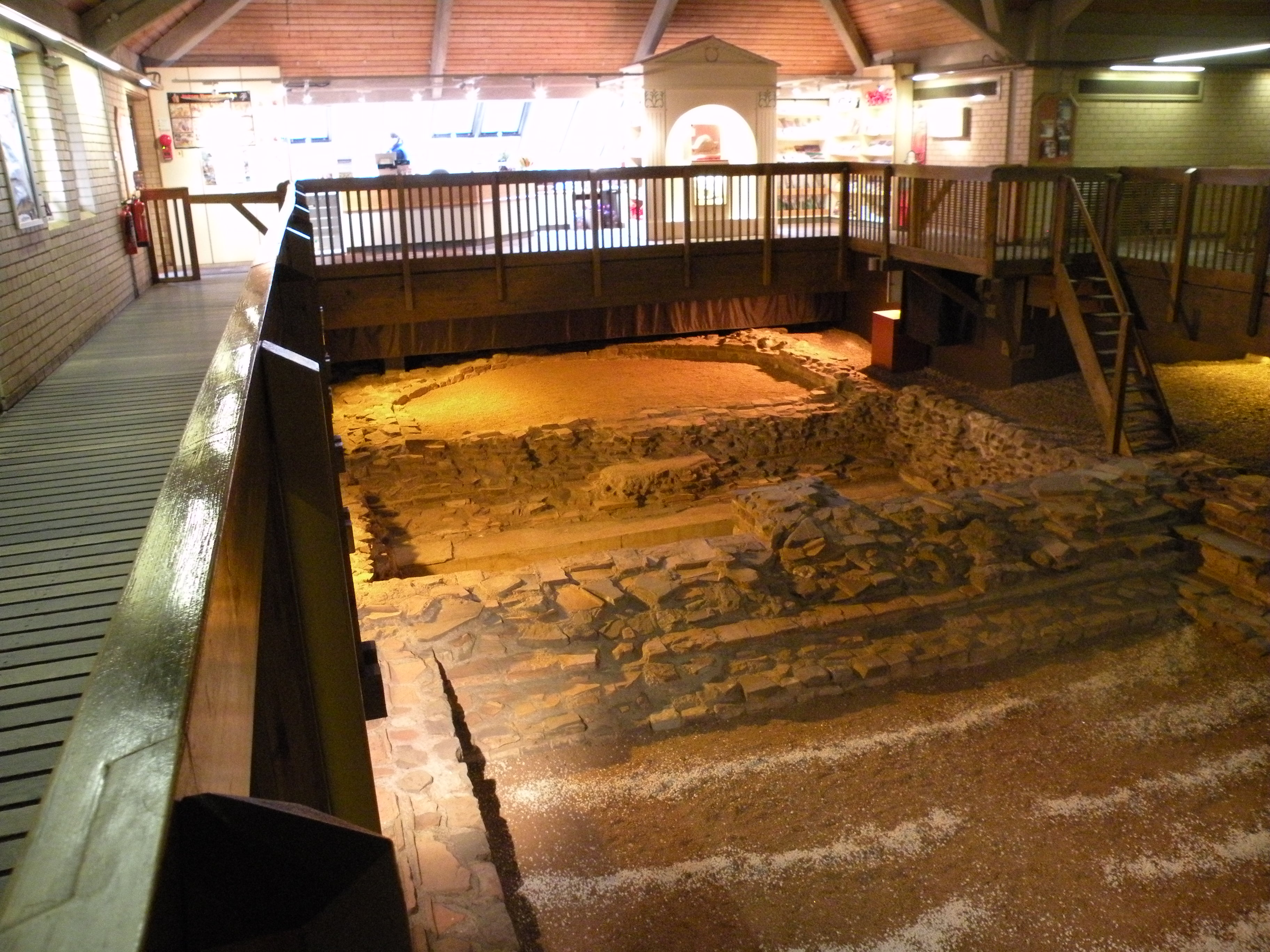
Interior of the Roman Baths Museum

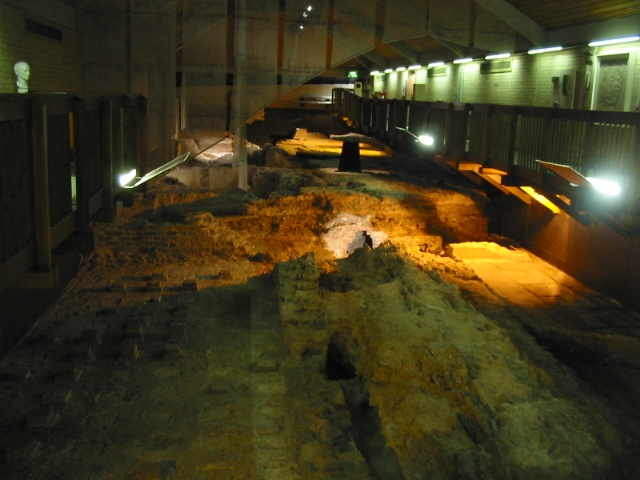

The Roman Baths Museum lies within the fortress walls, close to the National Roman Legion Museum, and were the principal baths for the legion. The baths museum has a covered walkway over part of the remains of the military bath house. There was a frigidarium, tepidarium and caldarium, as well as an open-air swimming pool. The baths museum is administered by Cadw and includes projected imagery to re-create the scenes of Roman bathers.

Within a short walk of the baths museum are:

- The most complete Roman amphitheatre in Britain
- Sections of the fortress walls
- The only remains of a Roman legionary barracks on view anywhere in Europe at Prysg Field

There were over 40,000 visitors to the Baths in 2012.

== See also ==
- Caerleon pipe burial
- Newport Museum
- Venta Silurum
- List of scheduled monuments in Newport
