= Urbs Legionis =

Urbs Legionis or Legionum (Latin for "city of the legion[s]") may refer to:

- Deva Victrix (Roman Chester) in northwest England
- Isca Augusta (Roman Caerleon) in southern Wales

== See also ==
- Eboracum (Roman York), sometimes thought to have been the original referent for some mentions of urbs legionis in Roman sources
