= Manners Mansions =

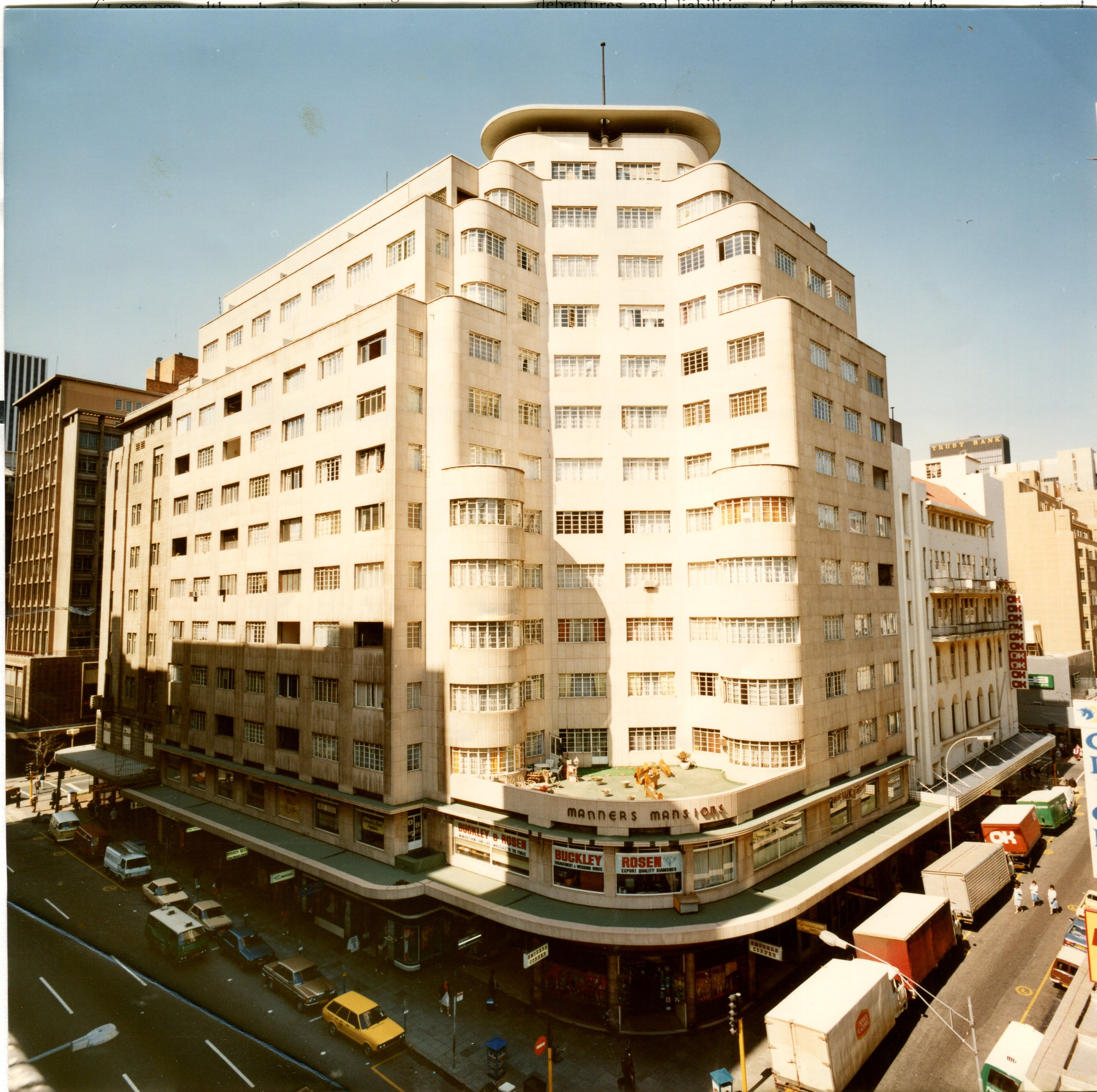
- Manners Mansions cnr Jeppe and Joubert Str Johannesburg

General information
- Status: Completed
- Type: Flats with Shops
- Location: Johannesburg, South Africa
- Coordinates: 26°12′13″S 28°2′11″E
- Completed: 1940

Technical details
- Floor count: 14

Design and construction
- Architect(s): Emley & Williamson

Manners Mansions was designed by the architectural firm of Emley and Williamson for African City Property Trust and was built in 1937-1939. The building is situated on stand 5198, at the corner of Jeppe and Joubert Streets in Johannesburg.

Manners Mansions is named after Sir George Espec John Manners.

== Design ==
The building has 14 storeys and a distinctive appearance with sweeping curved corners addressing the corner of the plot. The ground floor was set aside for shops and businesses with the floors above providing exclusive residential apartments. It resembles many buildings in New York City built around the same time.

The Building has similar features to the Ansteys Building as it was designed by the same architectural firm. Manners Mansions was famous for its ground floor high end shops and its beautiful curved art deco bronze and glass shop fronts. It also has the rounded corner house which for years was a popular venue for cigarette-and pipe-smokers. The tender price for Manners Mansions was £148,000 and the contractors were Reid & Knuckley Pty Ltd.

The interior includes a stylish horse shoe shaped staircase with mosaic detailing, which was featured in a fashion shoot in 1989. Glazing of the building was executed by Furman Glass Co. Ltd of Mooi Street Johannesburg using British glass.

== Shops and Businesses in Manners Mansions ==
Some of the early retailers and businesses within Manners Mansions are listed below:

- Madame Paulines – speciality clothing shop. Opened by Mrs Pickles. Interior designed by H.s. Tompkins
- The French Model School - Mannequin and Model Training, Deportment, Slimming and Facial Make-up, Dress Designing.
- Marlene Holdman – Beauty Salon and Cosmetic Bar.
- The Beauty Centre

== Residents of Manners Mansions ==
Some of the residents of Manners Mansions are listed below:

- Arthur Greene Brinton, Ophthalmic Surgeon – Late Lecturer in Ophthalmology at Witwatersrand University; Consulting Ophthalmic Surgeon, Johannesburg Hospital. In South Africa from 1902.
- Sam Caskie – Race horse owner and Professional Punter. Arrived in South African in 1903.
- Dr. The Hon. Henry Gluckman – Minister for Health and Housing in the Union Government headed by Field-Marshall J.C.Smuts. The only Jewish member of a South African Cabinet.
- Franz Wagner – Classical Musician and Pianist.

== Heritage Status ==
The Manners Mansions building is historically and culturally significant for the following reasons:

- Manners Mansions is associated with the architectural firm of Emley and Williamson
- The building is of high architectural quality and has aesthetic value
- Manners Mansions is culturally significant owing to its association with African City Property Trust and many well known local residents and businesses
- Manners Mansions was built more than 60 years ago and so qualifies as a heritage building
