= Caerleon pipe burial =

Second-century Roman grave

Caerleon
- Isca Augusta

Location
- Area of Newport
- Coordinates: 51.6050°N 2.9475°W
- Grid reference: ST336909

The Caerleon pipe burial is a second-century Roman grave from a cemetery associated with the former legionary fortress and settlement, Isca Augusta, in what is now Caerleon, Wales, United Kingdom. The main site, including its large amphitheatre, was excavated in the early twentieth century, largely by the archaeologist Tessa Wheeler, but its surrounding cemeteries were mainly known only through casual discoveries.

In 1927 building works on a site across the River Usk from the fortress led to the discovery of a grave containing a stone-lined tomb. Within the tomb was a lead canister containing cremated bone fragments and a piece of linen bearing traces of frankincense. Also present was a broken 38 mm (1.5 in) diameter lead pipe which would originally have reached the surface. This type of burial is rare in Britain and was investigated at the time of its discovery by the archaeologist Mortimer Wheeler. He consulted the anatomist Arthur Keith, who determined that the bone fragments belonged to a single adult, findings confirmed at re-examination in 2001 by Alice Roberts.

Tombs with vertical lead or earthenware pipes are found throughout the Roman Empire, and graves featuring other means of partial access from the surface also occur widely. These features are believed to have facilitated sacrifices and other offerings to the departed. In particular, pipe burials are thought to have allowed relatives to pour blood or wine into the container to nourish the soul of the deceased.

== Background ==
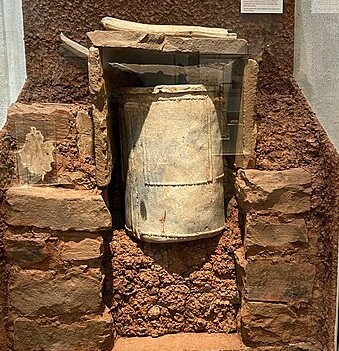
The canister in the National Roman Legion Museum at Caerleon, Wales. The broken pipe is on top.

Caerleon, a town in South Wales, is the site of a Roman legionary fortress and settlement (canaba), named Isca. It was the headquarters for Legio II Augusta from about 75 to 300 AD. The Romans called the site Isca or Isca Augusta after the River Usk (Welsh: Wysg). The name Caerleon may derive from the Welsh for "fortress of the legion"; around 800 AD it was referred to as Cair Legeion guar Uisc ('fortress of the legion on the Usk').

Antiquarian archaeological digs in 1908 and 1909 uncovered Caerleon's large amphitheatre and other Roman structures, and further progress included the acquisition for the nation (Note: Then the Office of Works, now Cadw.) and excavation of the amphitheatre in 1926–27. The professional archaeologist Tessa Wheeler expanded the settlement's main excavation site in 1927–28.

Across the river Usk from the excavation site there was a suburb known as Ultra Pontem (beyond the bridge), and a small settlement at nearby Bulmore. Tombstones of legionaries from these districts suggest that they may have been populated by retired soldiers. Cemeteries were located, as Roman law required, outside the legionary fortress and near its approach roads, and several burial grounds are known in the area. Although there are no extant visible traces of the burial sites that lay along the roads leading to the fortress, numerous tombstones and cremation graves have been recovered. There are several cemeteries around Bulmore, particularly above the road to Caerleon, and more graves at Abernant just to the east.

All known burials in the cemeteries are cremations, (Note: The soil at Caerleon does not preserve uncremated bone well, and no suspected inhumation graves have been properly excavated.) and most were identified from casual, unplanned finds, although parts of two large cemeteries have undergone professional excavation. These are Abbeyfield to the north of Caerleon, and the Ultra Pontem/Bulmore area, where the two burial sites nearly merge into each other. Building work at the Ultra Pontem site (still so-named at the time) in 1927 uncovered a stone-lined burial chamber, or cist, containing a lead canister, about 76 cm (2.5 ft) below the surface. Associated red terra sigillata suggested a second century date for the interment. Tessa Wheeler's husband, the archaeologist Mortimer Wheeler, was called in; having recorded details of the site, he took the canister to Caerleon Museum for further study.

== Grave and contents ==
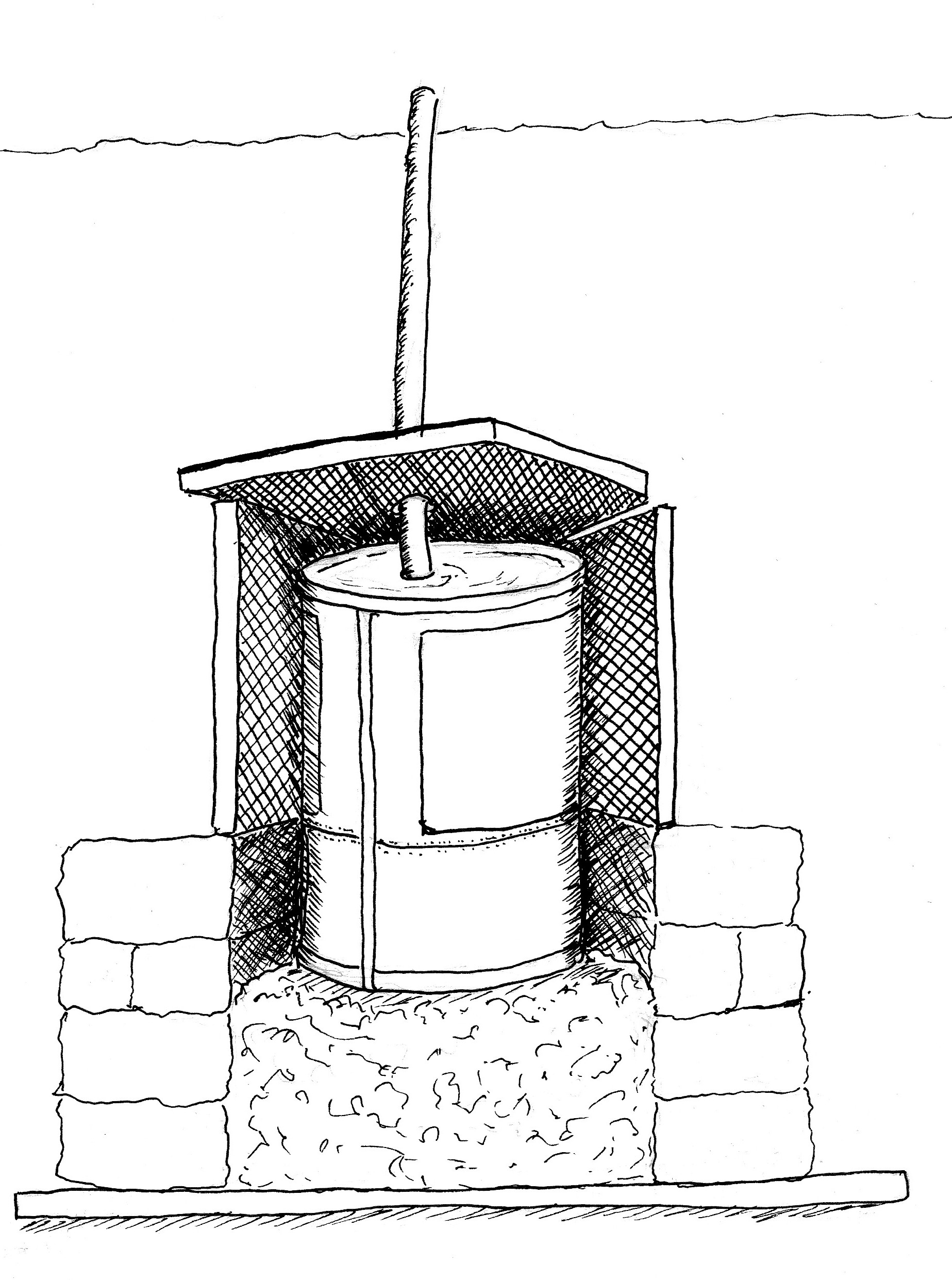
Sketch of the cremation burial with pipe attached

The burial cist had a base of stone slabs, with another serving as a lid, and contained a cylindrical lead container resting on about 30 cm (12 in) depth of brick, tile and charcoal debris, possibly remnants of a cremation pyre. The lead canister was 47 cm (18.5 in) high and 38 cm (15 in) in diameter, and had three rings of bead and reel pattern. Vertical flat mouldings between the upper two bands divided the surface into three panels. A vertical lead pipe 38 mm (1.5 in) wide was attached to the top of the canister. It is 99 cm (39 in) long, with a broken upper end, and would originally have reached the ground surface. It contained 1.3 kg (2.9 lb) of bone fragments from a cremation (grinding the cremation products to a fine powder is a recent practice).

Mortimer Wheeler sent the fragments to the anatomist Arthur Keith, who determined that the cremation was of one adult male aged at least 35 years. Alice Roberts re-examined the remains in 2001, and confirmed that they belonged to an adult, as age can be estimated by the degree of fusion of the sutures of the skull, but she did not think it was possible to reliably determine the sex of the deceased. Roberts found no pieces of skull or pelvis large enough for a reliable assessment, whereas Keith had based his judgement on the general size of the bone fragments. (Note: Roberts carried out 19 other examinations of bone fragments from the area of the pipe grave, but a double burial was the only unusual feature from these.)

Also in the lead container was a 17 cm × 11 cm (6.7 in × 4.3 in) fragment of plain weave linen textile that had originally contained the bone fragments, and in which Fourier-transform infrared spectroscopy detected traces of frankincense from the funeral rituals. Frankincense was an expensive resin used as incense, but also to anoint the corpses of those whose families could afford it, along with similar terpene-containing plant products. These aromatic substances would slow decomposition and hide unpleasant smells. A 2025 study of textile preservation in a cremation suggested that lead leaching from a container may also help preserve fabric.

A scanning electron microscope investigation revealed that tin and sulfur were present in the deposits within the canister. The lead canister and its contents are now in the collection of Amgueddfa Cymru – Museum Wales at the National Roman Legion Museum.

It is possible that a sacrificial table (mensa) was associated with the grave; one discovered at Caerleon in the eighteenth century is now lost.

== Burial practices ==
Pre-Roman Iron Age burials, whether of corpses or cremated remains, are rare across most of Britain but this changed after the island's incorporation into the Empire, and by the second century cremations were standard throughout the Roman province. A British pipe burial similar to that from Caerleon is known from near Colchester, and the remains of a burial that was found in 1980 near Mancetter, Warwickshire, included a lead pipe and a bluish-green glass jar containing bone fragments, with evidence that the pipe had once had a nailed-on lid of a perishable material. A pipe burial from Chichester connected the funerary urn to the surface, then 42 cm (17 in) above, using pairs of imbrices, semi-cylindrical fired clay tiles. Although they are rare in Britain, there are multiple lead or earthenware pipe burials from across the rest of the Roman Empire. The practice is known from Rome itself, and may have come to Britain through trade.

A Celtic site in Kent had a grave with a hole in the lid large enough to insert a hand, a feature also seen in some dolmens, and which may have served the same purpose of allowing the entry of food. Arthur Evans and Wheeler also mentioned similar permanent entry points in other megalithic tombs as far east as India, and in Ancient Egyptian mastaba.

The second-century Greek geographer Pausanias recorded a custom in his country of pouring blood from an animal sacrifice into a grave through a hole, and the Romans and Celts both incorporated sacrifices or offerings of animals, particularly pigs, in their burial rites. The Romans held funerary feasts by the graveside on the day of the interment, and again nine days later, in which food was left on the grave and wine poured on the soil. Further feasts were held on the deceased's birthday and at certain festivals, and at all of these celebrations a portion of the meal was set aside for the soul of the departed to share. Wine paraphernalia, such as bottles, cups and amphorae, were often left in burial chambers, as were trenchers and cutlery on occasion.

Wheeler gave examples of the practice of pouring libations into a grave from ancient Carthage and Mycenae, and in twentieth-century Africa, India and some Pacific islands, and both he and Roberts believed it to be likely that the pipe graves facilitated the pouring of blood or wine straight into the chamber for the more direct nourishment of the soul of the departed. Roberts also mentioned a custom still extant in Russia of leaving food and drink on the graves of dead relatives. Wheeler ended his discussion of graveside feasting with a reference to the final verse of an old English folk song, "Lavender's Blue".

If you should die, dilly dilly, as it may hap,
You shall be buried, dilly dilly, under the tap;
Who told you so, dilly dilly, pray tell me why?
That you might drink, dilly dilly, when you are dry.

== Cited texts ==
- Roberts, Alice (2023). Buried: An Alternative History of the First Millennium in Britain. Simon & Schuster. ISBN 978-1-3985-1005-0.
- Wheeler, Mortimer R. E. (1929). "A Roman Pipe-burial from Caerleon, Monmouthshire" (PDF). Antiquaries Journal. IX (1): 1–7. doi:10.1017/S0003581500012725.
