= Coria (Corbridge) =

Roman fort in Corbridge, England

- Coriosopitum, Corsopitum or Corsobetum
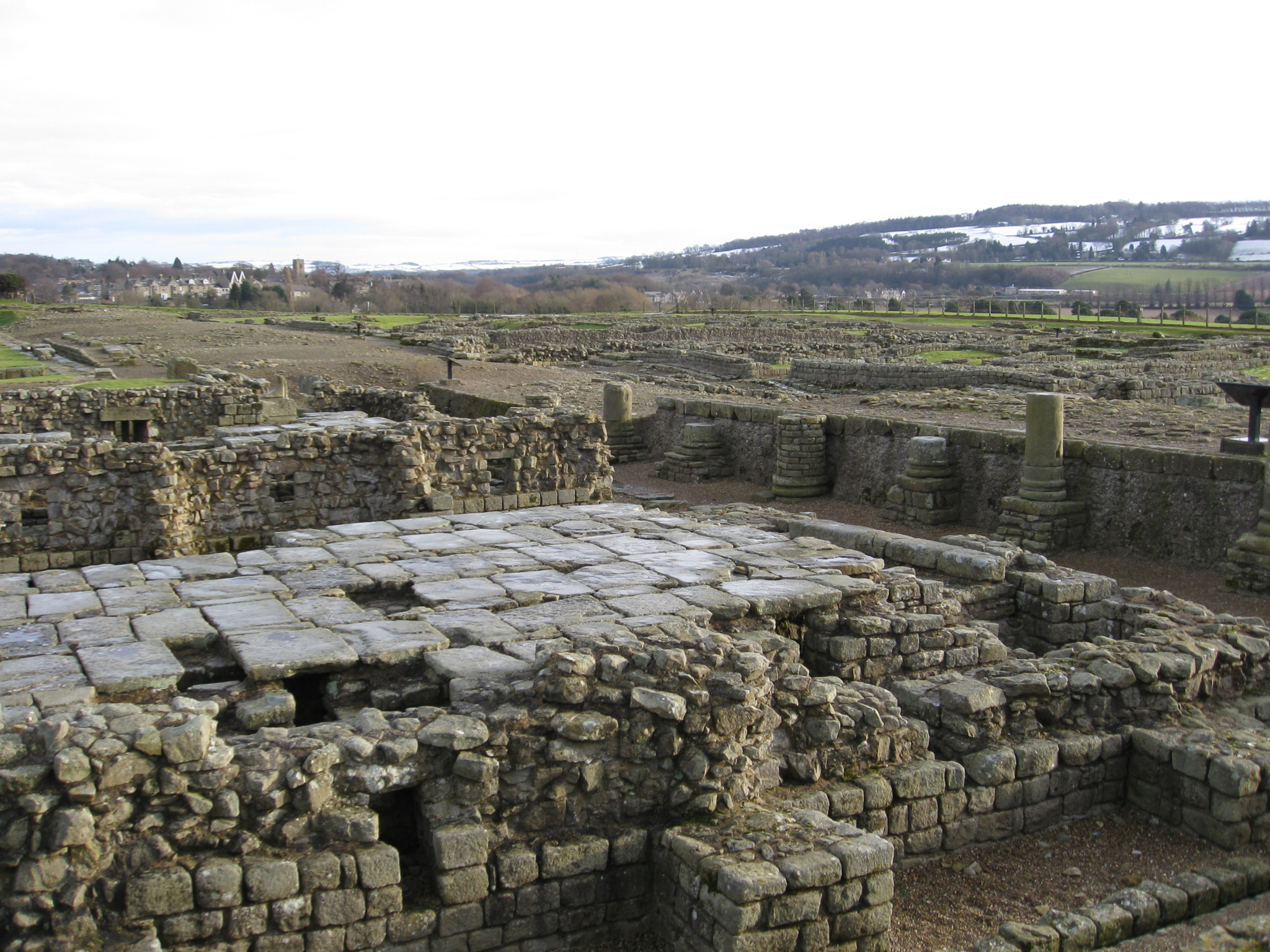
- Ruins of Corbridge’s Roman granaries

- Location within Northumberland
- 54.9784°N 2.03316°W
- Location: Northumberland, England

History
- Founded: c. 84 AD

Site notes
- Condition: Ruined

Coria was a fort and town 2.5 miles (4.0 km) south of Hadrian's Wall, in the Roman province of Britannia. It was strategically located on the junction of a major Roman north–south road (Dere Street) with the River Tyne and the Roman Stanegate road, which was also the first frontier line which ran east–west between Coria and Luguvalium (the modern Carlisle). Corbridge Roman Site is in the village of Corbridge in the county of Northumberland.

It is in the guardianship of English Heritage and is partially exposed as a visitor attraction, including a site museum.

== Name ==
The full Latin name is uncertain. The place-name appears in contemporary records as Corstopitum and Corie Lopocarium. These forms are generally recognised as corrupt. Suggested reconstructions include Coriosopitum, Corsopitum or Corsobetum. The Vindolanda tablets show that it was locally referred to by the simple form, Coria, the name for a local tribal centre. The suffix ought to represent the name of the local tribe, a member of the Brigantian confederation but its correct form is unknown. It gave its name to Corbridge, albeit by processes which are debated.

== History ==
=== Early occupation ===
There is evidence of Iron Age round houses on the site but the first Romans in the area built the Red House Fort, 0.5 mi (0.80 km) to the west, as a supply camp for Agricola's campaigns.

=== Forts ===
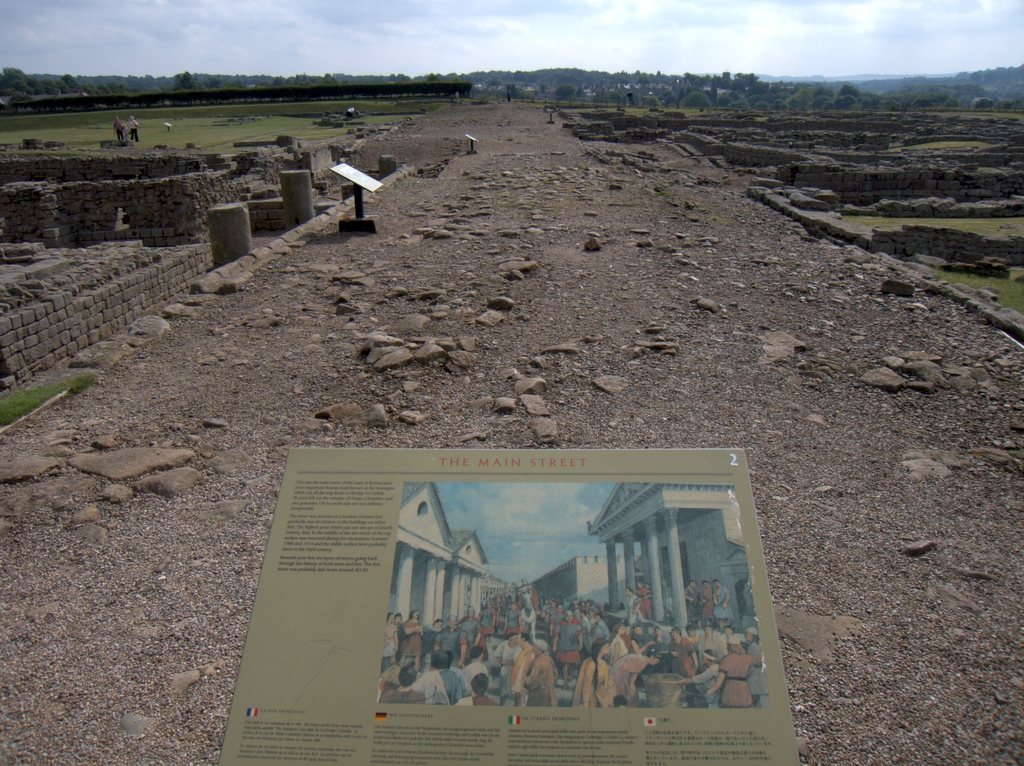
The Stanegate, Corbridge Roman Site

Soon after Roman victories in modern Scotland, around AD 84, a new fort was built on the site with turf ramparts and timber gates, as part of the Stanegate frontier system of linked forts. Barrack blocks surrounded a headquarters building, a commander's residence, administrative staff accommodation, workshops and granaries. It was probably occupied by a 500-strong cavalry unit called the Ala Gallorum Petriana but burnt down in AD 105. A second timber fort was built, guarding an important crossing of the River Tyne, when the Solway Firth–Tyne divide was the Roman frontier. Around AD 120, when Hadrian's Wall was built just over two miles to the north, the fort was rebuilt again, probably to house infantry away from the Wall. About twenty years later, when the frontier was pushed further north and the Antonine Wall built, the first stone fort was erected under the Governor Quintus Lollius Urbicus.

English Heritage has released monographs on the forts along Hadrian's Wall through the Archaeology Data Service. Bishop and Dore's report on the excavations at Corbridge 1947–80 reveal the complex history of the sequence of mainly earth and timber forts which preceded the masonry buildings.(available here) The reports also cover a metal hoard found within the fort, possibly linked to the abandonment between AD 122 and 138 (also available on the Archaeology Data Service website).

=== Town development ===
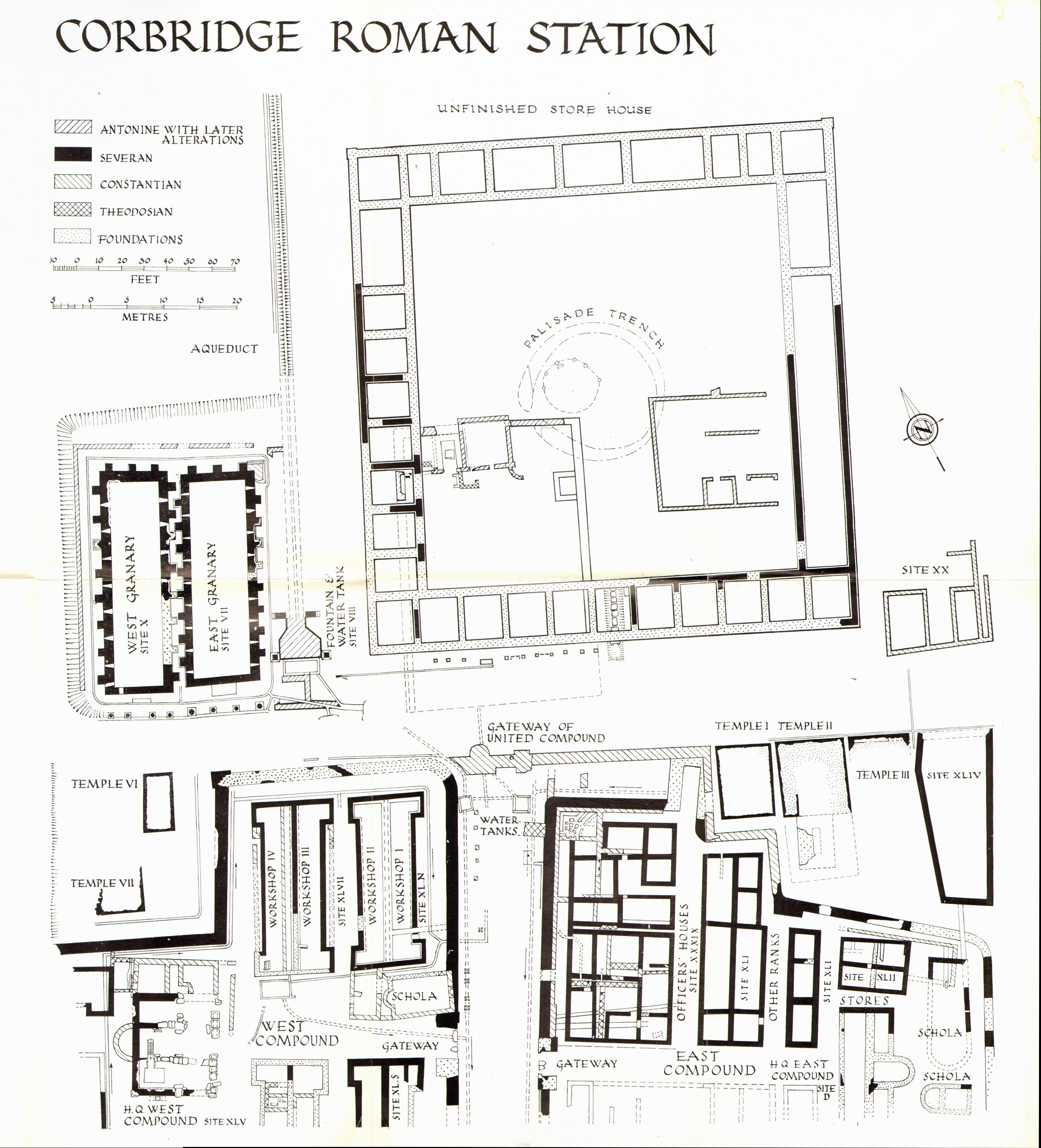
Plan of Coria showing the various stages of building; the twin granaries are at left

After the Romans fell back to Hadrian's Wall in AD 163, the army seems to have been largely removed from Coria. Its ramparts were levelled and a big rebuilding programme of a very different nature was instigated. A series of probable temples were erected, followed by granaries, a fountain house and a large courtyard complex, which may have been intended to become a civilian forum or a military storehouse and workshop establishment. It was never finished in its original plan.

Burnt timber buildings may relate to Cassius Dio's reference to tribes crossing the frontier but by the early 3rd century there was more construction. Two compounds opposite the supposed forum were built as part of a military supply depot within the town. It was connected with the Second and the Sixth Legion and may have been part of the supply network for Septimius Severus' northern campaigns.

An elaborate house was built in the 3rd-4th century which may have housed an Imperial official. Coria was probably a big market centre for the lead, iron and coal industries in the area, as well as agriculture, evidenced by the granaries. A pottery store has also been identified. When occupation came to an end is unclear. It is not even known if the site was still occupied when the Anglo-Saxons arrived to found adjoining Corbridge.

The Corbridge Hoard was found here.

=== Rediscovery ===
The first excavations were carried out in 1861 by a Mr Coulson but the plans, reports and drawings were lost and only a summary of his findings published in Archaeologica Aeliana.

In 1906 a small scale excavation was carried out on the site following a desire by the Northumberland County History Committee to assess the Roman remains at Corbridge, ahead of a book on the history of the parish, The excavation was overseen by Francis J. Haverfield and supervised by Leonard Woolley. This excavation showed the potential of the site and as the County History Committee could not undertake such a large work the Corbridge Excavation Committee was formed to continue the work. Excavations continued very year from 1907 to 1914. Leonard Woolley supervised the first part of the 1907 season from July to September then left for Egypt. R H Forster supervised the excavations from then on. A number of students and scholars also worked on the excavations, making it one of the first training excavations in British archaeology. They included J.P. Bushe-Fox. Brian Dobson later ran adult training excavations at Corbridge in the 1960s and 1970s.

== Tombstone of Flavinus, Roman Standard Bearer ==
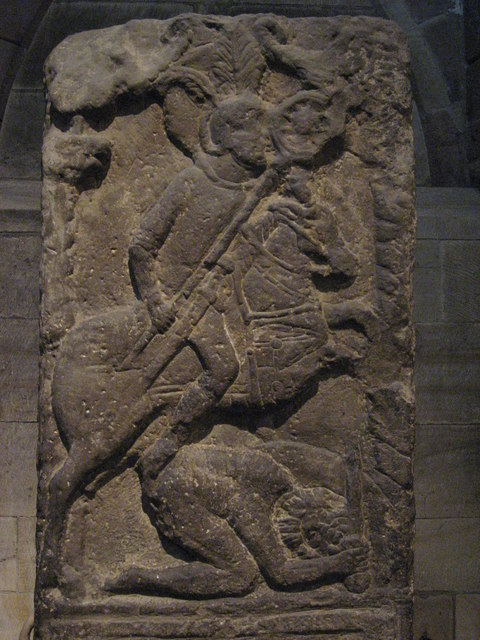
Tombstone of Flavinus, a Roman Standard Bearer, on display in Hexham Abbey, where it was found reused

Work on Hexham Abbey in Northumberland in 1881 brought to light a Roman funerary monument in the stonework of the south porch of the transept. An elaborately carved stone (now on display in the abbey) shows a standard-bearer in the Roman cavalry riding down a barbarian: its inscription shows it to commemorate Flavinus, an officer in the ala Petriana who died aged 25 after seven years' service. The ala Petriana is known to have been stationed at Corbridge, and the slab is thought to date to the late first century and to have once stood in the military cemetery near the fort there.

== In fiction ==
- In Rosemary Sutcliff's 1965 novel The Mark of the Horse Lord, the lead character is a gladiator in Corstopitum before he leaves to join the Dal Riata north of the Antonine Wall.
- In Mary Stewart's 1979 novel The Last Enchantment, Merlin and Ulfin pass through Cor Bridge on their way to spy on Morgause and Lot of Lothian in Dunpeldyr (Traprain Law near Dunbar, East Lothian).
- In Gillian Bradshaw's 1998 novel Island of Ghosts, three Sarmatian alae are stationed in Cilurnum, Condercum and Eburacum, and often have dealings in Corstopitum.
- In László Krasznahorkai's Man Booker International Prize-winning 1999 novel War and War, Corstopitum features as one of the sites visited by four mysterious travellers in a manuscript discovered by Korin, the central character of the novel.
- In Juliet Landon's 2006 historical romance The Warlord's Mistress, it is 208 AD and a beautiful spy from one of the Celtic tribes holding out against Roman rule is living in Coria, where she meets one of the Roman rulers.
- In Ruth Downie's 2008 novel, Terra Incognita, the protagonists find themselves near Coria as the action opens.
