= Lauriston Court =

- Location within Greater Johannesburg

General information
- Status: Extant
- Type: Residential
- Architectural style: Art deco
- Location: 186 Louis Botha Avenue, Johannesburg, South Africa
- Coordinates: 26.1692°S 28.0735°E
- Completed: 1936
- Client: African City Properties

Technical details
- Floor count: 5

Design and construction
- Architect: Frank Emley
- Architecture firm: Emley & Williamson

Lauriston Court is a residential building in Houghton Estate, Johannesburg. The building was designed by the prominent architecture firm, Emley and Williamson and completed in 1936.

== History ==
The Suburb of Orange Grove sits in a historically important location on Louis Botha Avenue, or The Old Pretoria Road as it was once known. It was the site of a Boer War blockhouse that is said to have had uninterrupted views North, towards Pretoria. Before that, The Orange Grove Hotel had also been important, as Paul Kruger, the president of the Zuid Afrikaanse Republiek had met various delegations there. By the 1930s, Art Deco had become the most fashionable style of architecture in Johannesburg and a number of Art Deco buildings were erected in Orange Grove and neighbouring Houghton, including Houghton Heights and Roxdale Mansions.

== Architects ==
Frank Emley was one of the preeminent architects in early Johannesburg. In partnership with William Leck he designed numerous important buildings in Johannesburg, including the Corner House Building (1903), and the Rand Club (1905). The partnership was also commissioned to design the homes of Sir Lionel Phillips, Judge Henry Hull and various other prominent members of early Johannesburg society. After the passing of Wiliam Leck, Emley won the competition for the new Central Block at the University of the Witwatersrand and brought on Frederick Williamson as a partner. Together they designed the main buildings at the University of the Witwatersrand campus (1920), and the Third Anstey's Building (1935). Lauriston Court was completed the year before The Third Anstey's Building, Emley and Williamson's Art Deco masterpiece.

== Features ==
The building is completely symmetrical and in the Art Deco style. It features a characteristic tower of cantilever bay windows towards each of the two wings, reminiscent of the curved cantilever balconies of the German Expressionist architect, Erich Mendelsohn. The facade of the building is of painted plaster with horizontal bands stretching the full length of the building. The approach to the entrance is via a mosaic stairway with an aluminium rail down the middle. The entrance is through a double wooden doorway, leading into an opulent, split level foyer with an unusual curved ceiling and diagonal chessboard marble floor. There is now a Heritage Association blue plaque, with a synopsis of the building's history, at the front gate.
