= Corbridge =

Village in Northumberland, England

Coordinates: 54.975°N 2.017°W

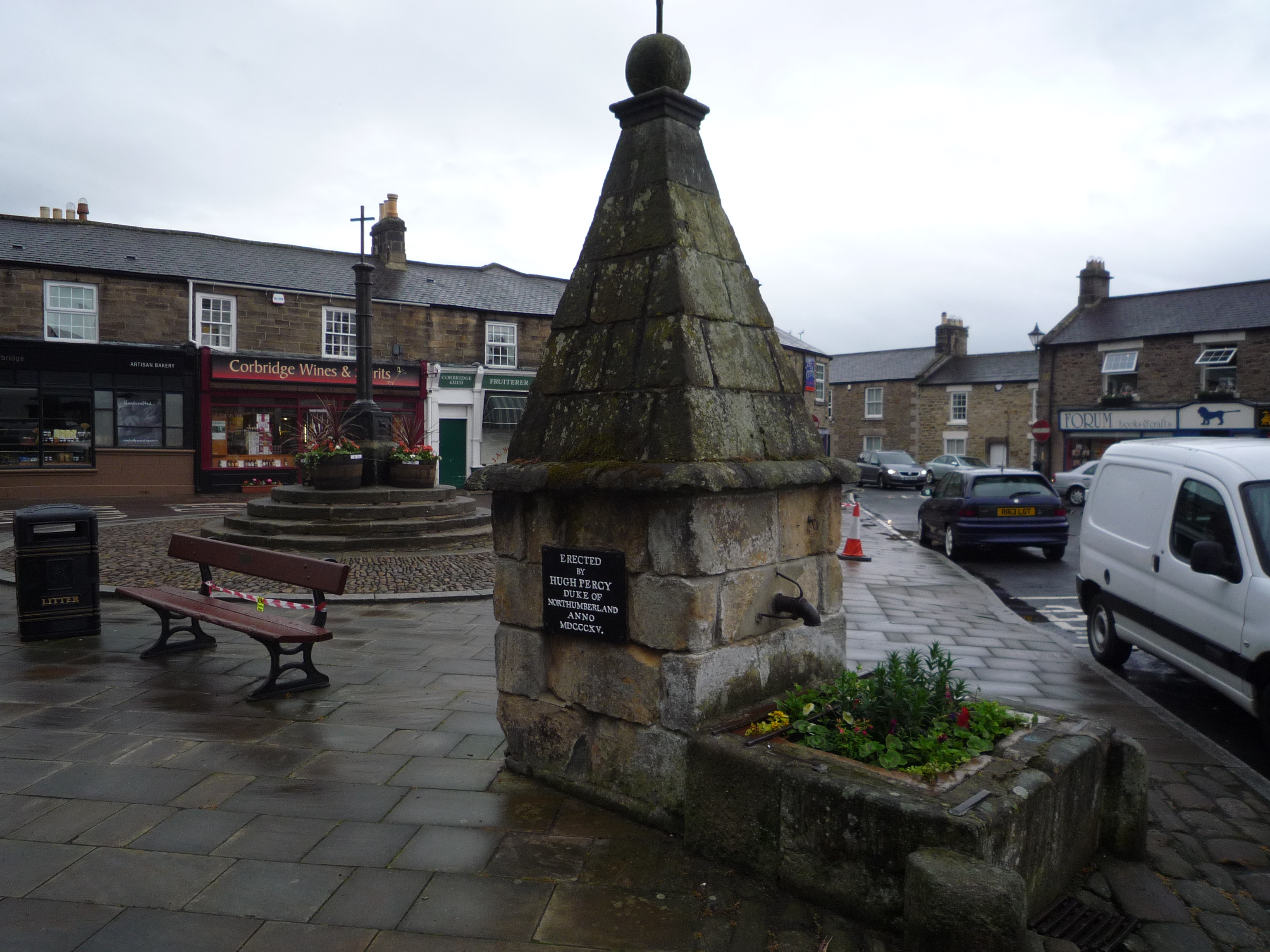
- Market Place, Corbridge town centre

- Location within Northumberland
- Population: 3,672 (2011)
- OS grid reference: NY990646
- Civil parish: Corbridge
- Unitary authority: Northumberland
- Ceremonial county: Northumberland
- Region: North East
- Country: England
- Sovereign state: United Kingdom
- Post town: CORBRIDGE
- Postcode district: NE45
- Dialling code: 01434
- Police: Northumbria
- Fire: Northumberland
- Ambulance: North East
- UK Parliament: Hexham
- Website: www.visitcorbridge.co.uk

Corbridge is a village and civil parish in Northumberland, England, 16 miles (26 km) west of Newcastle and 4 miles (6 km) east of Hexham. In 2011 the parish had a population of 3672. Villages nearby include Halton, Acomb, Aydon and Sandhoe.

== Etymology ==
Corbridge was known to the Romans as something like Corstopitum or Coriosopitum, and wooden writing tablets found at the Roman fort of Vindolanda nearby suggest it was probably locally called Coria (meaning a tribal centre). According to Bethany Fox, the early attestations of the English name Corbridge "show variation between Cor- and Col-, as in the earliest two forms, Corebricg and Colebruge, and there has been extensive debate about what its etymology may be. Some relationship with the Roman name Corstopitum seems clear, however".

== History ==
=== Roman fort and town ===
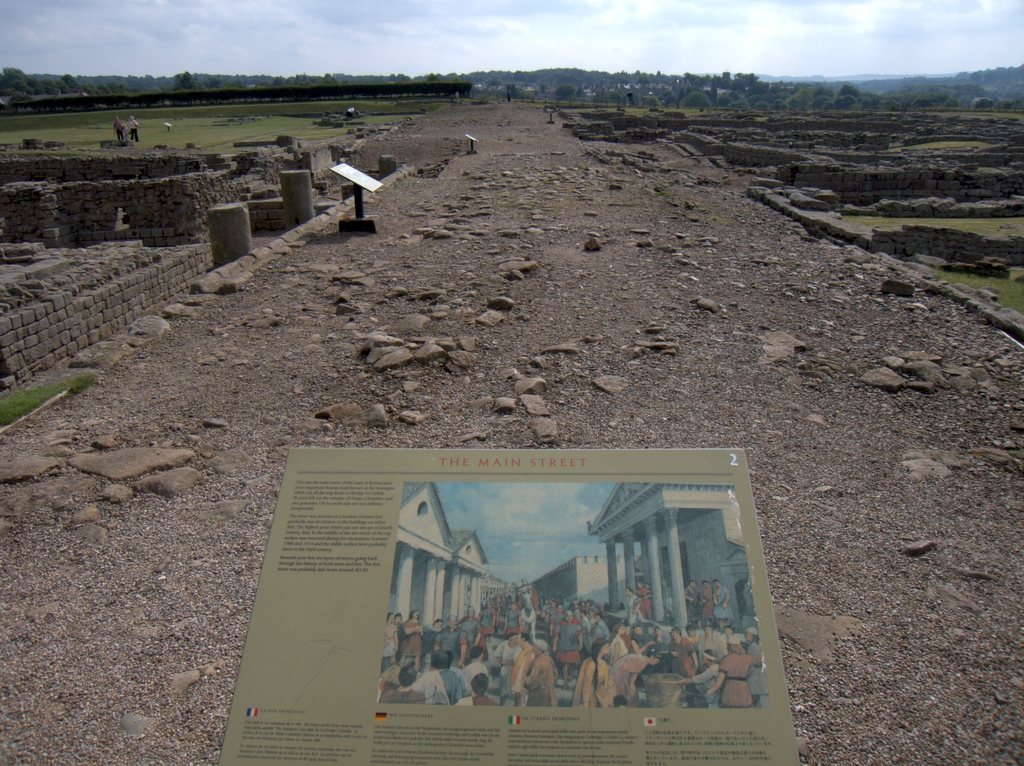
The Stanegate, Corbridge Roman Site

Coria was the most northerly town in the Roman Empire, lying at the junction of the Stanegate and Dere Street, the two most important local Roman roads.

The first fort was established c. AD 85, although there was a slightly earlier base nearby at Beaufront Red House. By the middle of the 2nd century AD, the fort was replaced by a town with two walled military compounds, which were garrisoned until the end of the Roman occupation of the site. The best-known finds from the site include the stone Corbridge Lion and the Corbridge Hoard of Roman armour and sundry other items. In Rudyard Kipling's Puck of Pook's Hill, the town of Hunno on the Wall is probably based on Corstopitum.

In February 1735, Isabel Cutter, the 9 year old daughter of a local cobbler found the silver Corbridge Lanx on the banks of the River Tyne near Corbridge.. Over a period of about 30 years in the early eighteenth century, a number of silver objects were found in the vicinity, which were probably part of a large Roman hoard.

The Roman Town is now managed by English Heritage on behalf of HM Government. The site has been largely excavated and features a large museum and shop. The fort is the top-rated attraction in Corbridge and is open daily between 10 and 6 in the summer and at weekends between 10 and 4 in the winter.

=== Buildings ===
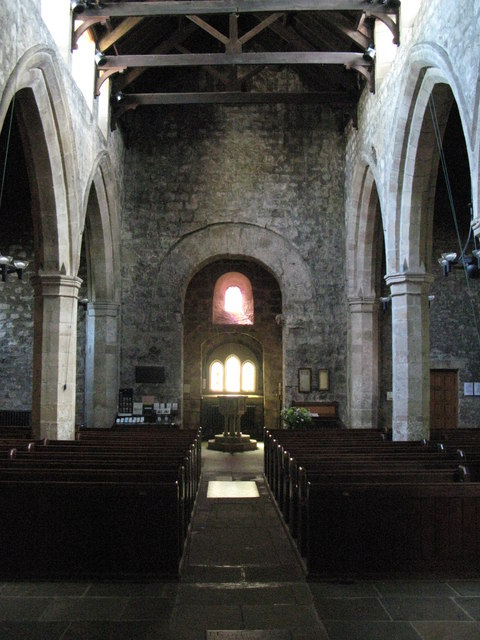
St Andrew's parish church, showing at centre its reused Roman arch, thought to have been brought from the nearby Coria Roman town.

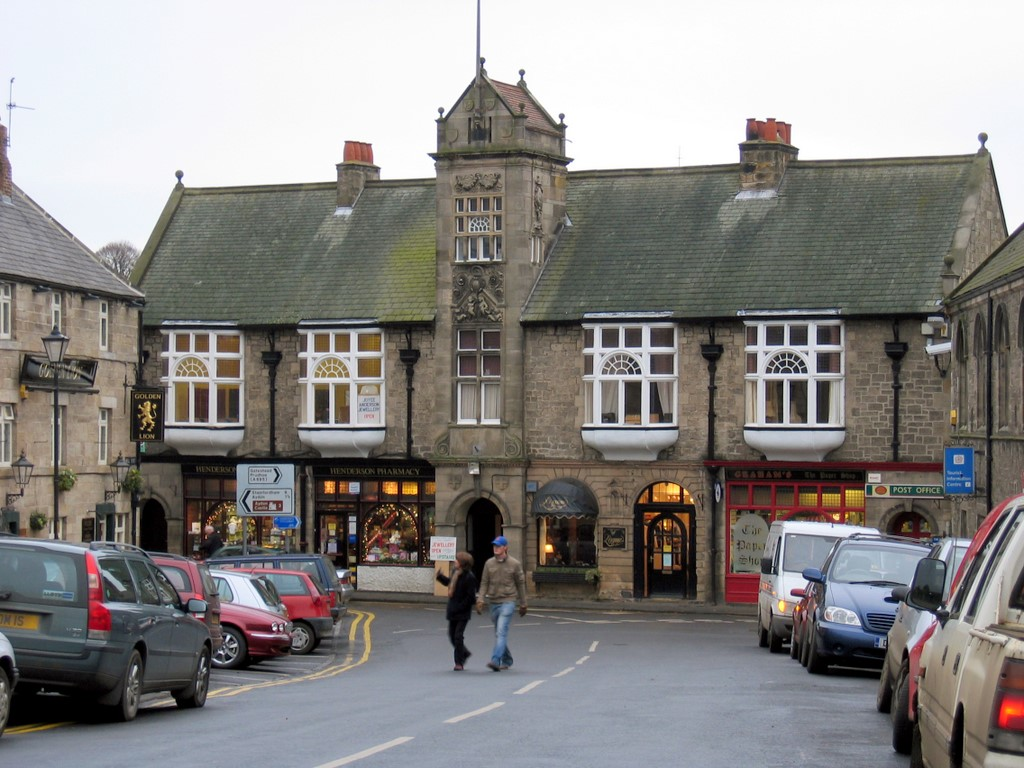
The former Corbridge Town Hall

The Church of England parish church of Saint Andrew is thought to have been consecrated in 676. Saint Wilfrid is supposed to have had the church built at the same time as Hexham Abbey. It has been altered several times since, with a Norman doorway, and a lychgate built as a First World War memorial. The Church is built largely from stone taken from Hadrian's Wall to the north, and the entrance to the Church is through glass doors given by Rowan Atkinson (known for Blackadder and Mr. Bean) and etched in memory of his mother, a parishioner.

There are only three fortified vicarages in the county, and one of these is in Corbridge. Built in the 14th century, the Vicar's Pele is to be found in the south-east corner of the churchyard, and has walls 1.3 metres (4 ft) in thickness. The register for St Andrew's dates from 1657. Later on in the town's history, Wesleyan, Primitive and Free Methodist chapels were all built too.

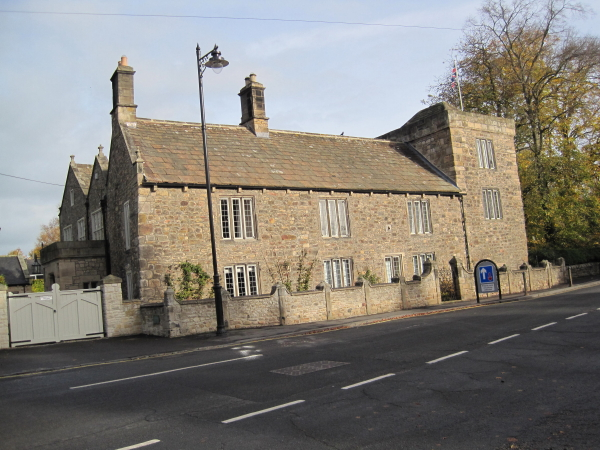
Corbridge Low Hall

Even older than the Vicar's Pele is Corbridge Low Hall, dating from the late 13th or early 14th century, with one end converted to a pele tower in the 15th century. The main block was remodelled in the 16th and 17th centuries, and the building restored c. 1890. Corbridge Town Hall was designed by Frank Emley and completed in 1887.

A number of fine Victorian mansions were developed on Prospect Hill to house successful industrialists and local businessmen in the late 19th century, after the arrival of the railway facilitated commuting to Newcastle.

=== Border warfare ===
Corbridge suffered, as did many other settlements in the county, from the border warfare which was particularly prevalent between 1300 and 1700. Raids were commonplace, and it was not unusual for the livestock to be brought into the town at night and a watch placed to guard either end of the street for marauders. In 1297, Scots led by William Wallace laid waste to Northumberland from Hexham up to the walls of Newcastle upon Tyne, burning Corbridge and many other towns. A bridge over the Tyne was built in the 13th century, but this original has not survived. The present bridge, an impressive stone structure with seven arches, was erected in 1674.

== Governance ==
Corbridge is in the parliamentary constituency of Hexham, Joe Morris of the Labour Party is the Member of Parliament.

Prior to Brexit, for the European Parliament its residents voted to elect MEP's for the North East England constituency.

For Local Government purposes it belongs to Northumberland County Council a unitary authority. An electoral ward of the same name exists. This ward includes Corbridge and Sandhoe. It had a total population taken at the 2011 census of 4,191. The Parish itself is run by Corbridge Parish Council which elects 10 Councillors on 4 year terms; one of them is selected by members of the council to be Chairman and Vice Chairman respectively on 1 year terms. They meet on the fourth Wednesday of every month. The Meetings take place at Corbridge Parish Hall.

== Transport ==
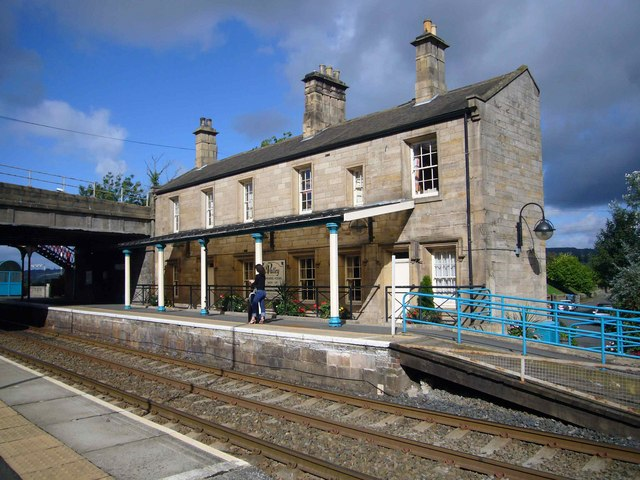
Corbridge railway station

Corbridge is bypassed to the north by the A69 road, linking it to Newcastle and Carlisle. It is also linked to Newcastle and the A1 by the A695 which passes about 1 mile (1.6 km) away on the south side of the River Tyne.

Buses

The 684, 685 and Tyne Valley 10 bus routes link the town to Newcastle and Hexham. Service 685 also provides a link to Carlisle

Railway

The town is served by Corbridge railway station on the Newcastle & Carlisle Railway, also known as the Tyne Valley line. The line was opened in 1838, and links the city of Newcastle upon Tyne in Tyne and Wear with Carlisle in Cumbria. The line follows the course of the River Tyne through Northumberland.

Passenger services on the Tyne Valley Line are operated by Northern. The line is also used for freight.

The railway station is about 1 mile (1.6 km) away on the south side of the River Tyne.

== Fairs and shows ==
Stagshaw Bank Fair, traditionally held on 4 July, was one of the most famous of the country fairs. It included a huge sale of stock, and was proclaimed each year by the bailiff to the Duke of Northumberland. The Northumberland County Show, an agricultural event, was held in the fields outside Corbridge each year before moving to Bywell in 2013.

The Corbridge Steam Fair and Vintage Rally is held every year in June to celebrate steam engines. There are also classic cars, trucks and tractors.

Corbridge Festival has taken place since 2011 and is usually held on the last weekend of June or the first in July. Headliners have included The Coral and Fun Lovin' Criminals. The festival now includes three stages and up to 50 bands.

A Midsummer’s Evening in Corbridge marks the summer solstice each year with performers, stalls and late night shopping in the village from 4pm to 9pm.

Each year on the first Monday in December, the village hosts Christmas in Corbridge with carol singing, food stalls and late night shopping.

== Notable people ==
Born in Corbridge

- Alan Brown (footballer) (1914–1996), professional footballer and manager
- Graham Carr (born 1944), professional footballer, manager and scout
- Mary Flora Bell (born 1957), woman who at age 11 was convicted of the manslaughter of two younger boys
- Steve Bruce (born 1960), professional footballer and manager
- John Blackburn (1923–1993), thriller writer
- Maggie Telfer (1959–2023), health activist

Lived in Corbridge

- Dame Catherine Cookson (1906–1998), author
- Carol Malia (born 1968), BBC Look North presenter
- Rachel Unthank, folk musician
- Ruth Ainsworth (1908–1984), children's writer of the "Rufty Tufty Golliwog" series

== Sources ==
- Grundy, John (2022). History of Northumberland. Newcastle upon Tyne: Tyne Bridge Publishing. ISBN 9781838280970.
- Middlebrook, Sydney (1968). Newcastle upon Tyne. Its Growth and Achievement. Wakefield: S.R. Publishers ltd.
