= Frank Emley =

English architect

Frank Emley (1861, in Durham – 1938, in Bedford) was an English architect, who played an important part in designing several buildings in early Johannesburg in the practices of Leck and Emley and Emley and Williamson.

== Early life ==
Emley worked as an assistant in his father's firm which specialised in church fittings. He is only known to have designed one building in England, Corbridge Town Hall.

== Style ==
During his time in Johannesburg, Emley designed masterpieces in a variety of styles, ranging from the Victorian Eclecticism of Hohenheim, to the grand Edwardian Baroque of the Rand Club, The Neo-Classicism of The university of the Witwatersrand to his Art Deco sky scrapers of the 1930s.

== List of important buildings ==
- Hohenheim/House Lionel Phillips - 1892
- The First Chamber of Mines Building - 1894 (Emley and Scott)
- Sunnyside/House Hennen Jennings - 1895
- The Third Corner House building - 1903 (Leck and Emley)
- The Third Rand Club Building - 1905 (Leck and Emley)
- Savernake - 1904 (Leck and Emley)
- Emoyeni/House Henry Hull - 1905 (Leck and Emley)
- University of the Witwatersrand Central Block - 1922 (Emley and Williamson)
- Union House - 1933 (Emley and Williamson)
- Castle Mansions - 1935 (Emley and Williamson)
- Lauriston Court - 1934 (Emley and Williamson)
- The Aegis building - 1934 (Emley and Williamson)
- The Third Anstey's Building - 1937 (Emley and Williamson)
- Manner's Mansions - 1939 (Emley and Williamson)
