= Halton, Northumberland =

Village in Northumberland, England

Coordinates: 55.004°N 2.004°W

Halton
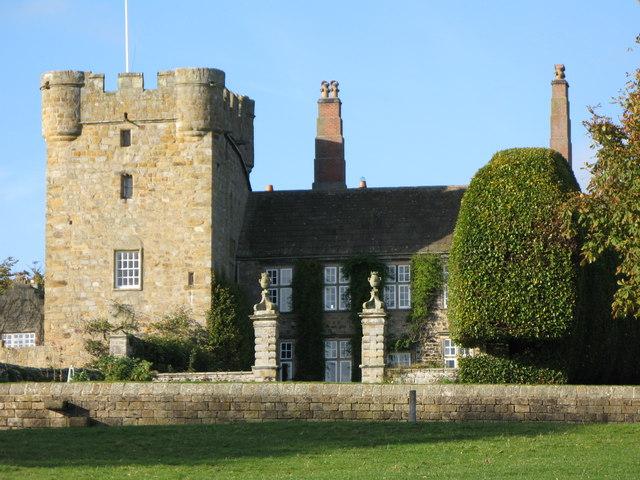
- Halton Castle

- Location within Northumberland
- OS grid reference: NY997677
- Civil parish: Whittington
- Unitary authority: Northumberland
- Ceremonial county: Northumberland
- Region: North East
- Country: England
- Sovereign state: United Kingdom
- Post town: CORBRIDGE
- Postcode district: NE45
- Dialling code: 01434
- Police: Northumbria
- Fire: Northumberland
- Ambulance: North East
- UK Parliament: Hexham

Halton is a village and former civil parish, now in the parish of Whittington, in the southern part of Northumberland, England. It is situated 3 miles (4.8 km) north of Corbridge just south of Hadrian's Wall. In 1951 the parish had a population of 24.

Halton Castle is a pele tower and grade I listed building.

== Governance ==
Halton was formerly a township and chapelry in Corbridge parish, from 1866 Halton was a civil parish in its own right until it was abolished on 1 April 1955 to form Whittington.
