= Corbridge Lanx =

Roman silver dish

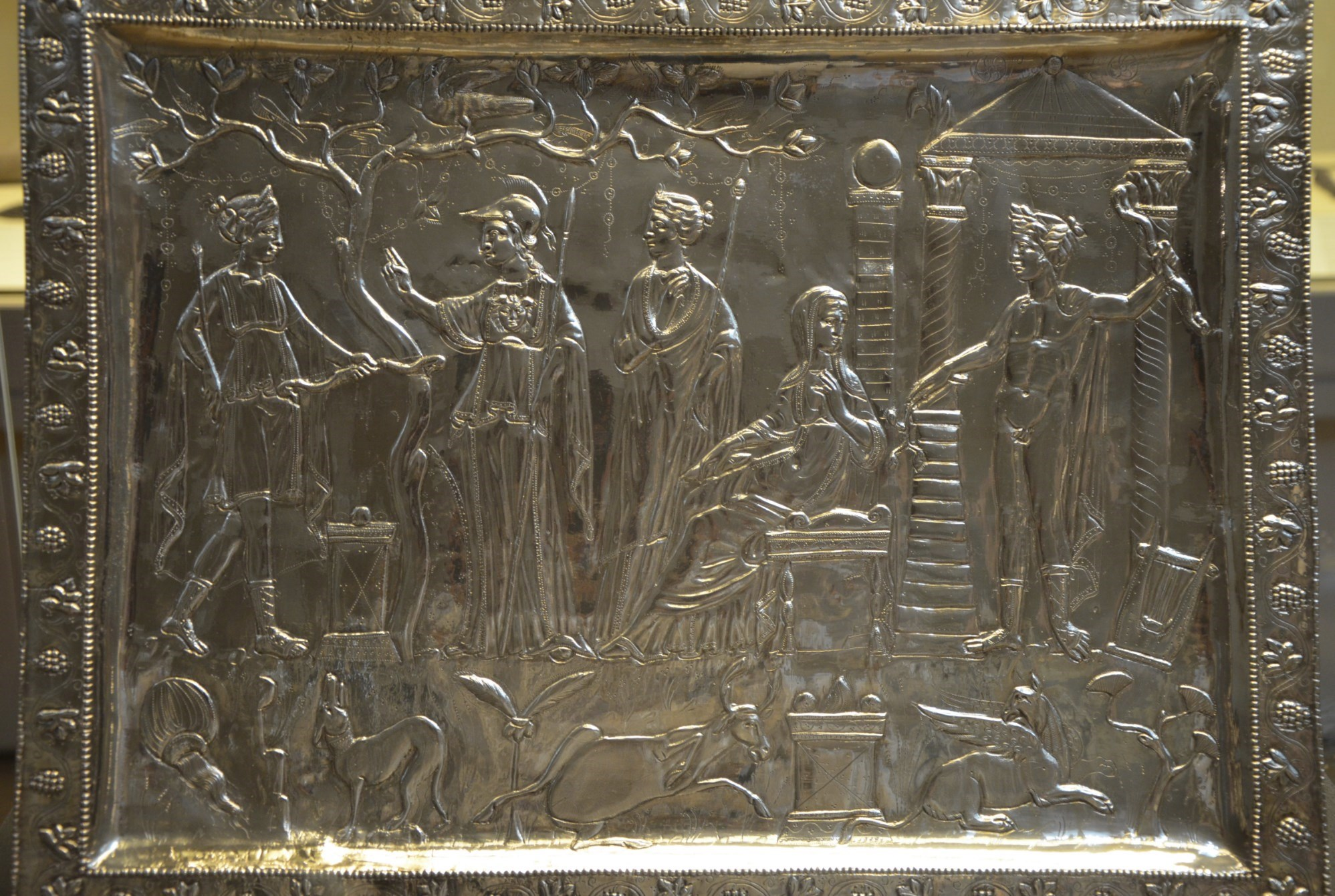
- The Corbridge Lanx as displayed in the British Museum
- Material: Silver
- Size: Length 50.3 cm, Width 38 cm, Weight 4.6 kg
- Created: 4th Century AD
- Discovered: 1735
- Present location: British Museum, London
- Registration: 1993,0401.1

The Corbridge Lanx is the name of a Roman silver dish found near Corbridge, Northern England in 1735. Once part of a large Roman treasure, only the silver lanx remains from the original find. The British Museum eventually purchased it in 1993.

== Discovery ==
In February 1735, Isabel Cutter, the 9 year old daughter of a local cobbler found the silver lanx on the banks of the River Tyne near the village of Corbridge, Northumberland. Over a period of about 30 years in the early eighteenth century, a number of silver objects were found in the vicinity, which were probably part of a large Roman hoard. Unfortunately, all other items from the treasure disappeared, with only the Corbridge Lanx remaining. The lanx became the property of the Dukes of Northumberland and remained in their possession until 1993, when it was sold by Henry Percy, 11th Duke of Northumberland to the British Museum.

== Description ==
The large silver tray is rectangular in shape and is engraved with mythological scenes from antiquity. Designed either as a serving dish for Roman banquets or as a ritual tray for sacrifices, this particularly extravagant example is similar in style to several platters from the Mildenhall Treasure and can be dated to the 4th Century AD. The main scene on the dish shows the god Apollo at the entrance to a shrine, clasping a bow with a lyre at his feet. To his left enter the goddesses Artemis and Athena in conversation. The two female deities in the centre have not been conclusively determined. In front of the gods is depicted an altar, flanked by Artemis's hound, a fallen stag and a griffin, a mythical animal often associated with Apollo.

== See also ==
- Corbridge Hoard
- Risley Park Lanx

== Bibliography ==
- D. Strong, Greek and Roman Silver Plate (British Museum Press, 1966)
- L. Burn, The British Museum Book of Greek and Roman Art (British Museum Press, 1991)
- S. Walker, Roman Art (British Museum Press, 1991)
- T.W. Potter, Roman Britain, 2nd edition (London, The British Museum Press, 1997)

== Sources ==
- Grundy, John (2022). History of Northumberland. Newcastle upon Tyne: Tyne Bridge Publishing. ISBN 9781838280970.
