= Corbridge Town Hall =

Municipal building in Corbridge, Northumberland, England

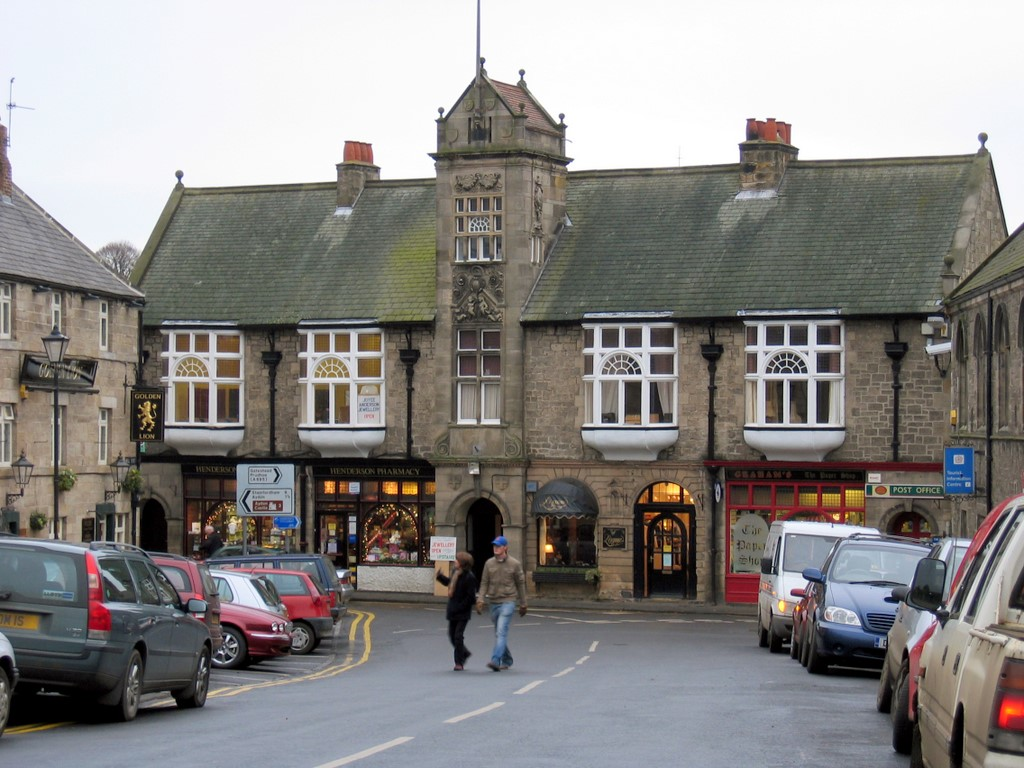
- Corbridge Town Hall

- Shown in Northumberland
- 54.9742°N 2.0172°W
- Location: Princes Street, Corbridge

History
- Built: 1887

Site notes
- Architect: Frank Emley
- Architectural style: English Renaissance style

Listed Building – Grade II
- Official name: Town Hall with shops
- Designated: 15 April 1969
- Reference no.: 1044757

Corbridge Town Hall is a municipal building in Princes Street in Corbridge, Northumberland, England. The building, which is now in commercial use, is a Grade II listed building.

== History ==
In the mid-1870s, a group of local businessmen decided to form a company to raise funds for the erection of an events venue in the town in order to celebrate the Golden Jubilee of Queen Victoria. The site they selected was a focal location in the town facing the top of Hill Street.

The building was designed by Frank Emley in the English Renaissance style, built with snecked masonry at a cost of £2,000 and was officially opened on 18 June 1887. The design involved a symmetrical main frontage with five bays facing onto Princes Street; the central bay, which slightly projected forward, featured a three-stage tower with an arched doorway with an architrave and a keystone in the first stage and mullioned and transomed windows in the second and third stages, all surmounted by a cornice, a parapet and a pediment with a projecting flagpole and finials. In the outer bays, there were doorways with architraves and keystones, and, in the fourth bay from the left which was rusticated, there was a doorway and a rounded headed window. There were for large oriel windows on the first floor. The ground floor was designed for retail use while, on the first floor, there was an assembly hall which was capable of accommodating 500 people.

The architectural historian, Nikolaus Pevsner, liked the design which he described as "pretty" and "Norman Shavian" the latter being a reference to the architectural style of Richard Norman Shaw. The building was primarily used for community events with the Corbridge and District Gardeners' Society being typical of the various organisations which regularly used the building.

However, activity reduced in the second half of the 20th century and in the late 1970s the company that had originally developed the town hall got into financial difficulties and was wound up. After the company's assets, including the building, had been sold community activities were transferred to Corbridge Parish Hall in St Helen's Street, and the town hall was put to commercial uses including café, art gallery and restaurant.
