= Maggie Telfer =

British health activist (1959-2023)

Maggie Telfer OBE
- Born: 1959; Corbridge, Northumberland
- Died: 12 January 2023 (aged 63); Bristol, England
- Education: Swansea University
- Occupation: Health activist
- Years active: 1980-2023
- Employer: Bristol Drugs Project

Maggie Telfer (1959 – 12 January 2023) was a British health activist who provided pioneering support services to drug users in Bristol, England. She was a co-founder of the Bristol Drugs Project in 1986, and acted as its chief executive until her death.

== Personal life ==
Telfer was born in Corbridge, Northumberland, in 1959, and was raised in Hedley on the Hill, the first of two daughters. After completing her education in Durham, she went on to study History and Russian Studies at Swansea University, graduating in 1980.

Telfer met her husband Richard, a journalist, while studying in Swansea, Wales. They had two daughters together.

== Work and activism ==
After graduating in 1980, Telfer managed the Swansea Accommodation for the Single Homeless, a night shelter.

In 1985, Telfer moved to Bristol, England, and, alongside probation officers, established the Bristol Drugs Project in 1986. The organisation was founded in response to an increase in heroin usage in Bristol, alongside a concurrent rise in petty crime and lack of local drug services. The Bristol Drugs Project was one of the first substance misuse services in the United Kingdom to focus on harm reduction by offering practical and therapeutic support to substance users to break the cycle of addiction, crime, and imprisonment.

Through the Bristol Drugs Project, Telfer created one of the first needle exchanges in England, and called on lawmakers to make heroin treatment a part of primary healthcare. She also established support for teenage drug users as well as sex workers, two groups that had largely been neglected by national drug services in the 1980s and 1990s.

In the 2000s, Telfer spearheaded Bristol's response to increasing ketamine usage in the city. She also pioneered outreach work at night clubs and festivals in the area. Internationally, between 2002 and 2004 Telfer assisted the establishment of the Omari Project in Kenya, the first needle exchange in sub-Saharan Africa. The Omari Project went on to become a drug rehabilitation centre that was still operating as of 2023.

In 2013, Telfer established an apprenticeship scheme for recovering older drug addicts to help them rejoin the workforce, or in some cases, join the workforce for the first time.

In January 2023, Telfer died at her home in Bristol following a short illness. A public memorial for her was held in St. George's Church, Bristol, in March 2023, on the Bristol Drugs Project's 37th anniversary.

== Recognition ==
In 2007, Telfer was awarded an Order of the British Empire for her charity work supporting people with substance misuse problems.

In 2018, Telfer was named as one of the 100 most influential women in the West Country, as well as in 2021 as one of the 87 most influential women in Bristol.
