= Lanx =

Ancient Roman serving platter

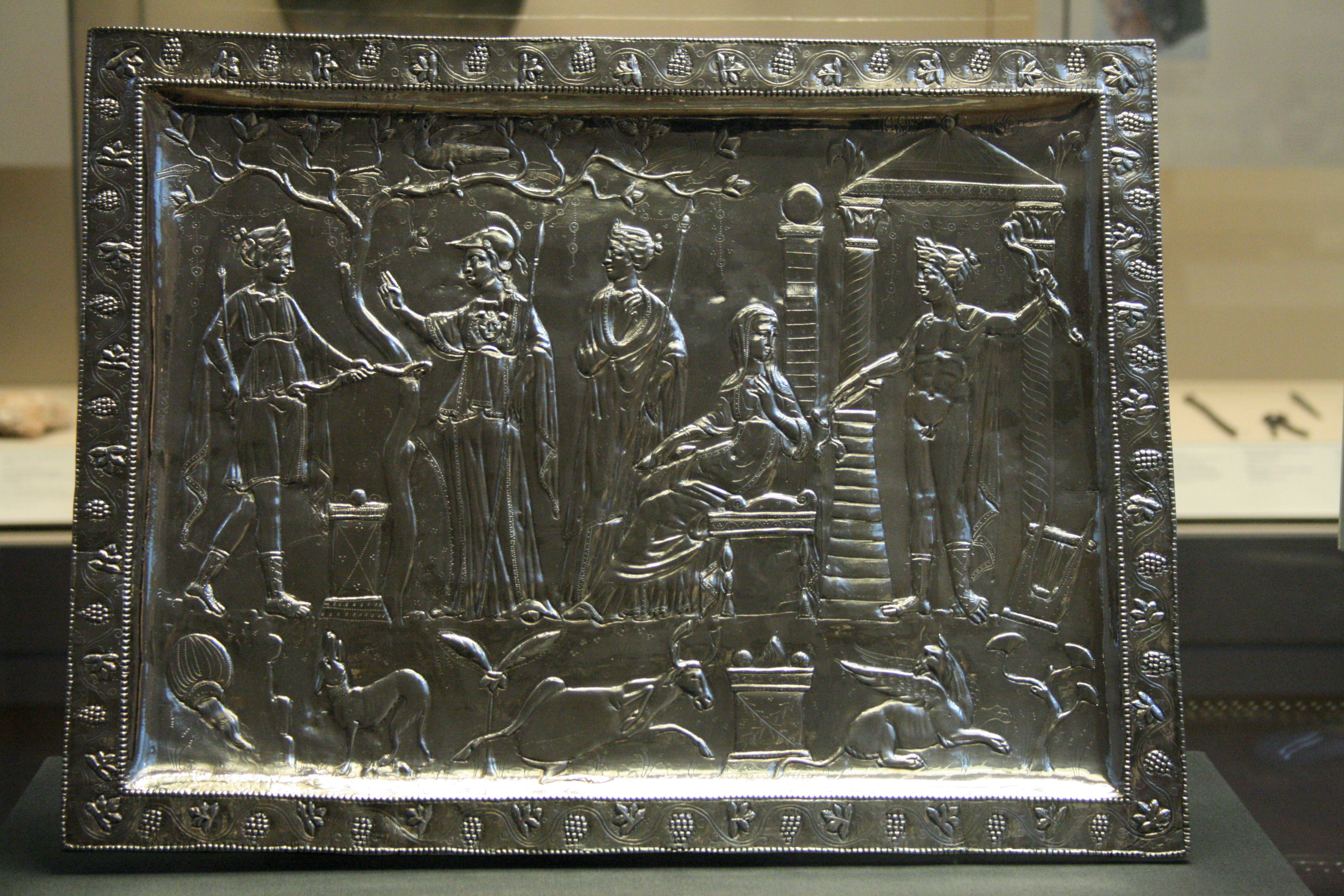
The Corbridge Lanx (British Museum)

A lanx (Latin for dish) was a large ancient Roman serving platter. Particularly ornamented ones were used to make offerings or sacrifices. Indeed, the silver Corbridge Lanx, the second discovered in Britain, has depicted on it a lanx itself, set beside various gods and goddesses: Minerva, Diana, Juno, Vesta and Apollo.

Positioned atop an altar, "of a globular form". Fruit as well as sheep parts and "other small victims" were likely used. However, the exact meaning in this representation has not been determined. The inscription on the now lost Risley Park Lanx, which was the first lanx discovered in Britain indicated that it was "church plate."
