= Corbridge Hoard =

Hoard of artefacts excavated in England

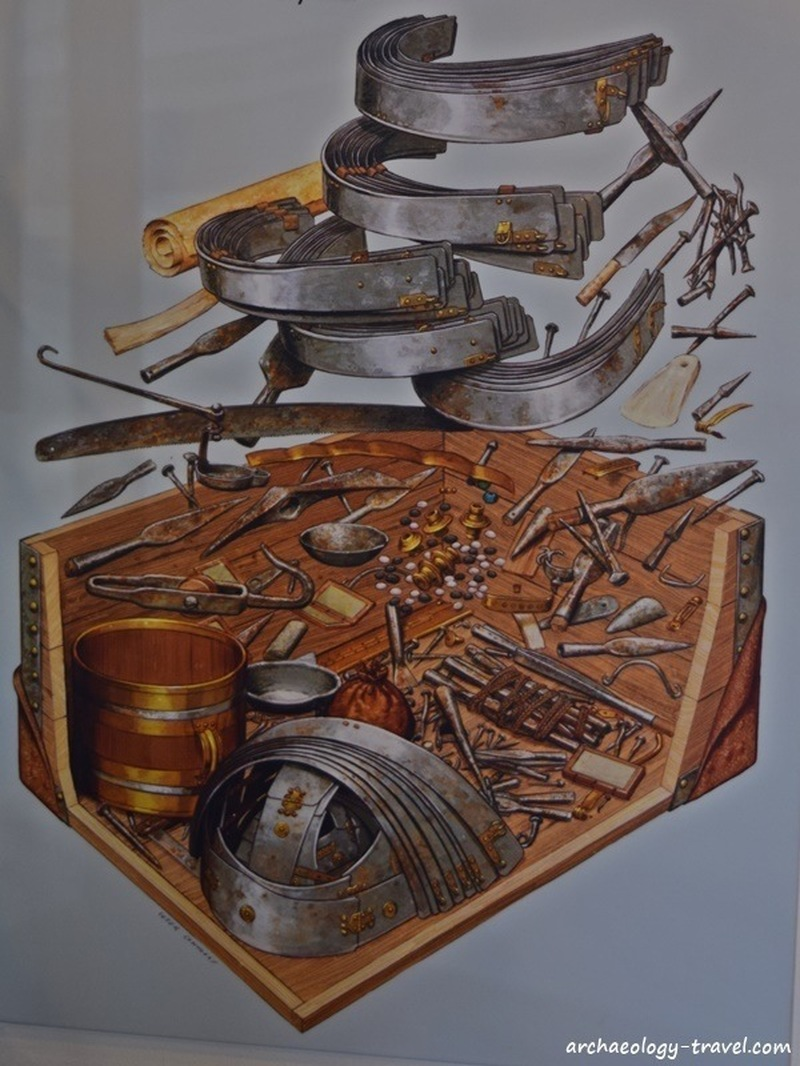
Artist impression

The Corbridge Hoard is a hoard of mostly iron artefacts that was excavated in 1964 within the Roman site of Coria, next to what is now Corbridge, Northumberland, England.

It came from amongst the central range of administrative buildings in one of the early forts underlying the later Roman town and probably dates to between AD 122 and 138.

== Contents ==
The contents (which included iron/steel, copper-alloy, lead-alloy, stone, glass, and organic items) were buried in an iron-bound, leather-covered chest, made of alder-wood planks fitted together with dovetails at the corners.

The most famous objects within were six upper and six lower half-units of 'lorica segmentata' armour which, although mis-matched, could represent as few as three whole cuirasses, or elements of twelve partial sets. It was this discovery that enabled Charles Daniels and H. Russell Robinson to understand how this type of armour should be reconstructed. Prior to the discovery of the Hoard, "people knew there was the segmented armour, but we didn’t know how it was put together or how it was made".

The Corbridge Hoard also contained bundles of spearheads still tied together with cord; artillery bolts; a sword scabbard; various tools and implements (including a pulley-block and a crusie lamp); items associated with carpentry, such as nails and joiner's dogs; a small wooden bucket or tankard. There were also fragmentary remains of feathers (possibly cushion stuffing or helmet plumes), wax writing tablets, and (almost uniquely in Roman Britain) fragments of papyrus.

All of the organic components in the Hoard (including the box itself) had been preserved by mineralization brought about by the rusting of its iron and steel contents.

The Hoard has been variously interpreted as material hurriedly concealed from attacking barbarians; deliberately buried in order to accumulate verdigris and rust for medicinal purposes; or detritus from clearing out a workshop when a garrison moved on from the site (and buried to deny the raw materials to an enemy).

The full English Heritage report on the contents and interpretation of the hoard is now available through the Archaeology Data Service

== Display ==
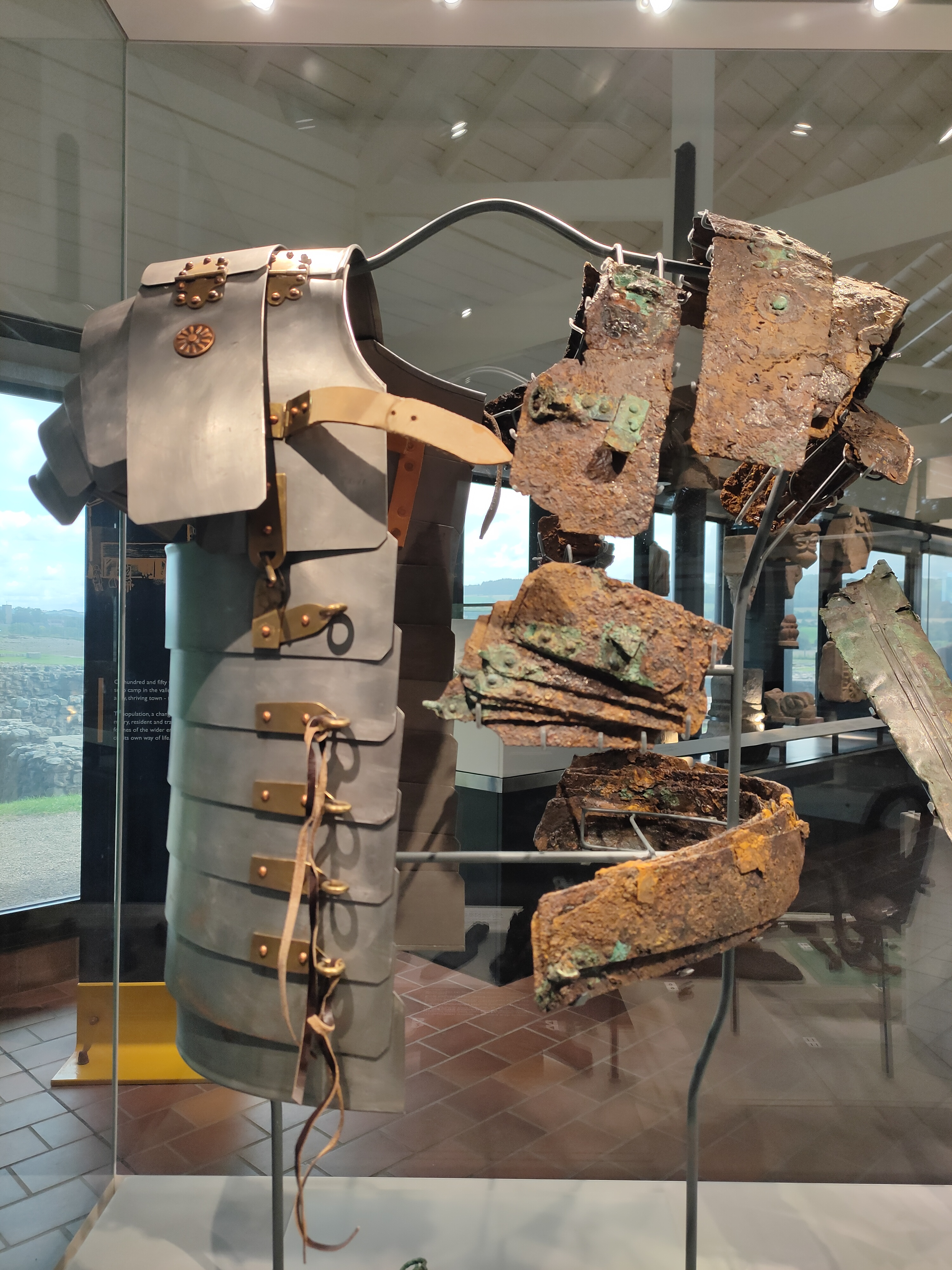
Lorica segmentata remains (right half) and recreation (left half). Displayed in the museum at the Corbridge Roman site.

Parts of the Hoard are on display at Corbridge Roman Site museum, whilst some other material from it is on display in the Great North Museum in Newcastle upon Tyne. From August 2012, the Hoard is in a new display at the Corbridge Roman site. The exhibition includes a replica which will help visitors envisage how the armour once looked as well as a film showing footage never before shown in public of the excavation of the hoard as it was dug up from the trench in 1964.

A reproduction Roman armour based on the Corbridge Hoard made by H. Russell Robinson in the late 1960s for the Congress of Roman Frontier Studies is in the collection of the National Roman Legion Museum. Another is held by the Great North Museum: Hancock

== See also ==
- Corbridge Lanx – Roman silver dish
- List of hoards in Britain
