= Ruth Downie =

English author

Ruth Downie (born 18 April 1955, North Devon, England) is an English author. She is best known for her mysteries featuring the “reluctant sleuth”, Gaius Petreius Ruso, that are set in the Roman world.

== Bibliography ==
- Ruso and the Disappearing Dancing Girls (2006), published as Medicus in the United States
- Ruso and the Demented Doctor (2008), published as Terra Incognita in the United States
- Ruso and the Root of all Evils (2009), published as Persona Non Grata in the United States
- Ruso and the River of Darkness (2010), published as Caveat Emptor in the United States
- Semper Fidelis (2013)
- Tabula Rasa (2014)
- Vita Brevis (2016)
- Memento Mori (2018)
- Prima Facie (2019)
