= National Roman Legion Museum =

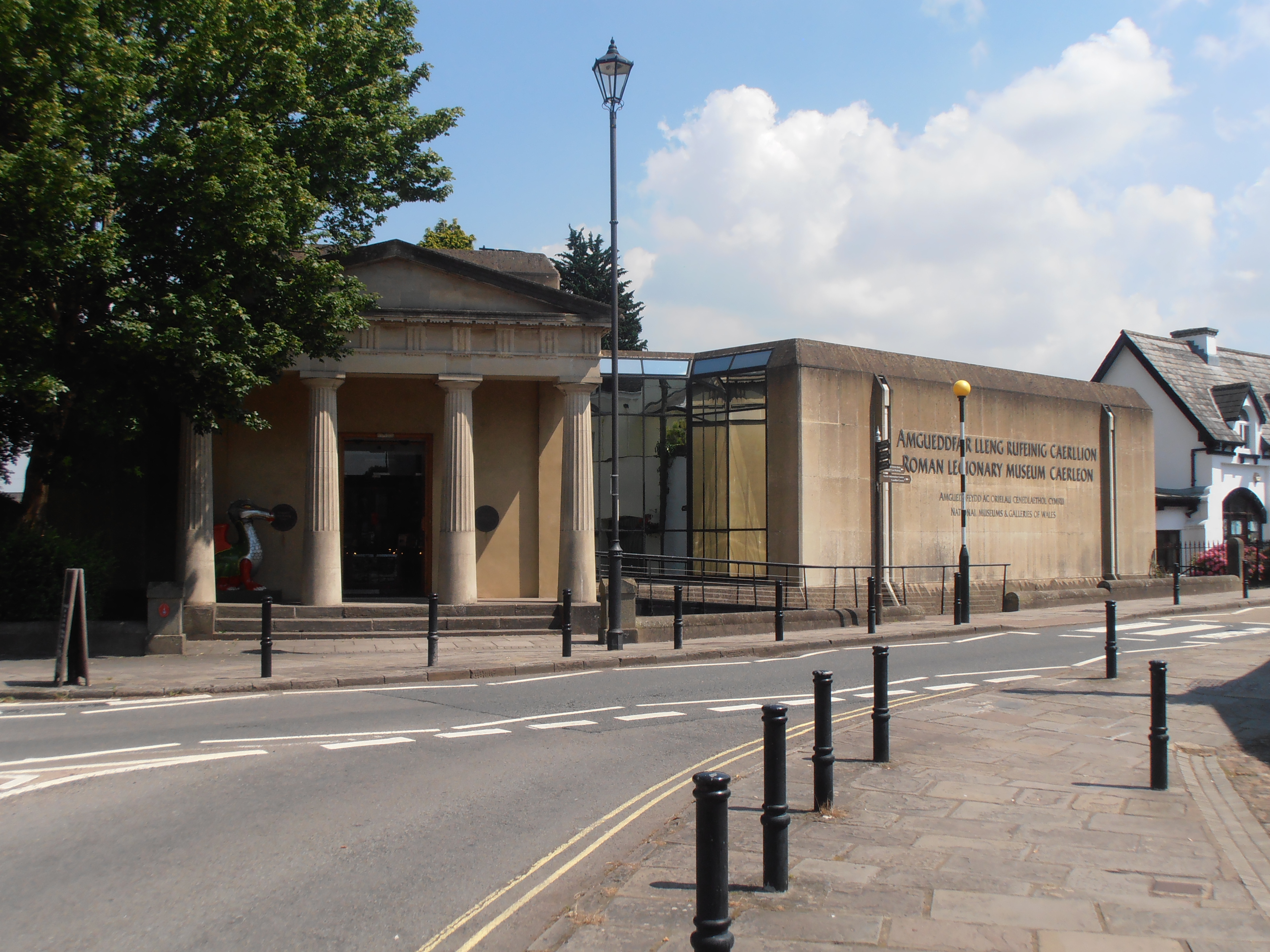

- Museum location in Newport, Wales
- Location: Caerleon, Newport, Wales
- Coordinates: 51.61005°N 2.95529°W
- Type: Archaeological museum
- Website: National Roman Legion Museum

The National Roman Legion Museum (Wales) (Welsh: Amgueddfa Lleng Rufeinig Cymru) is a museum in Caerleon, near Newport, south-east Wales. It is one of three Roman sites in Caerleon, along with the Baths museum and the open-air ruins of the amphitheatre and barracks. It is part of the wider network of Amgueddfa Cymru – Museum Wales.

== History ==
Roman Wales was the farthest point west that the Roman Empire in Roman Britain extended to, and as a defence point the fortress at Isca Augusta, now Caerleon, built in 75 AD, was one of only three permanent Roman Legionary fortresses in Roman Britain. It was occupied and operational for just over 200 years.

The National Roman Legion Museum lies inside what remains of the fortress, and contains many artefacts from the period of Isca Augusta of Legio II Augusta from Roman currency to uniforms.

A short walk from the National Roman Legion Museum is the remains of Isca Augusta:

- Part of the military bath house in the Roman Baths Museum
- The most complete Roman amphitheatre in Britain
- Sections of the fortress walls
- The only remains of a Roman legionary barracks on view anywhere in Europe at Prysg Field

== Museum ==
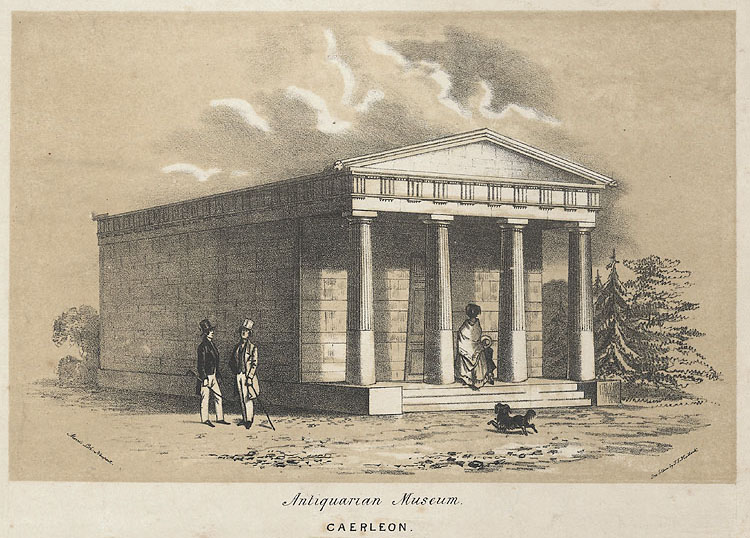
The original museum

The museum is located in the centre of Roman Isca, on what was the via principalis leading to the amphitheatre.

The first museum building was the Antiquarian Museum of 1850. This was built to a design by H.F Lockwood of Hull, a simple box-shaped building of Bath stone. Its only architectural feature of note was the pillared portico in the Greek Doric style. Little is known of the original building but it is known to have re-used ship's timbers in its roof and stone details from the Old Market House of Caerleon which had been demolished shortly before. It is often claimed that the timbers are from HMS Collingwood, although this ship was in service at the time and had no obvious connection to Newport.

The museum building was Grade II listed in 1951, but was largely demolished during the 1987 rebuilding and enlargement of the museum. Only the portico now remains. The new building is in a modernist style, but equally featureless and windowless as the original.

The museum’s collection includes a reproduction Roman armour based on the Corbridge Hoard made by H. Russell Robinson in the late 1960s for the Congress of Roman Frontier Studies.

The museums's main gallery

== See also ==
- Newport Museum
- Venta Silurum
