= Ansteys Building =

Art deco building in Johannesburg, South Africa

Anstey's Building
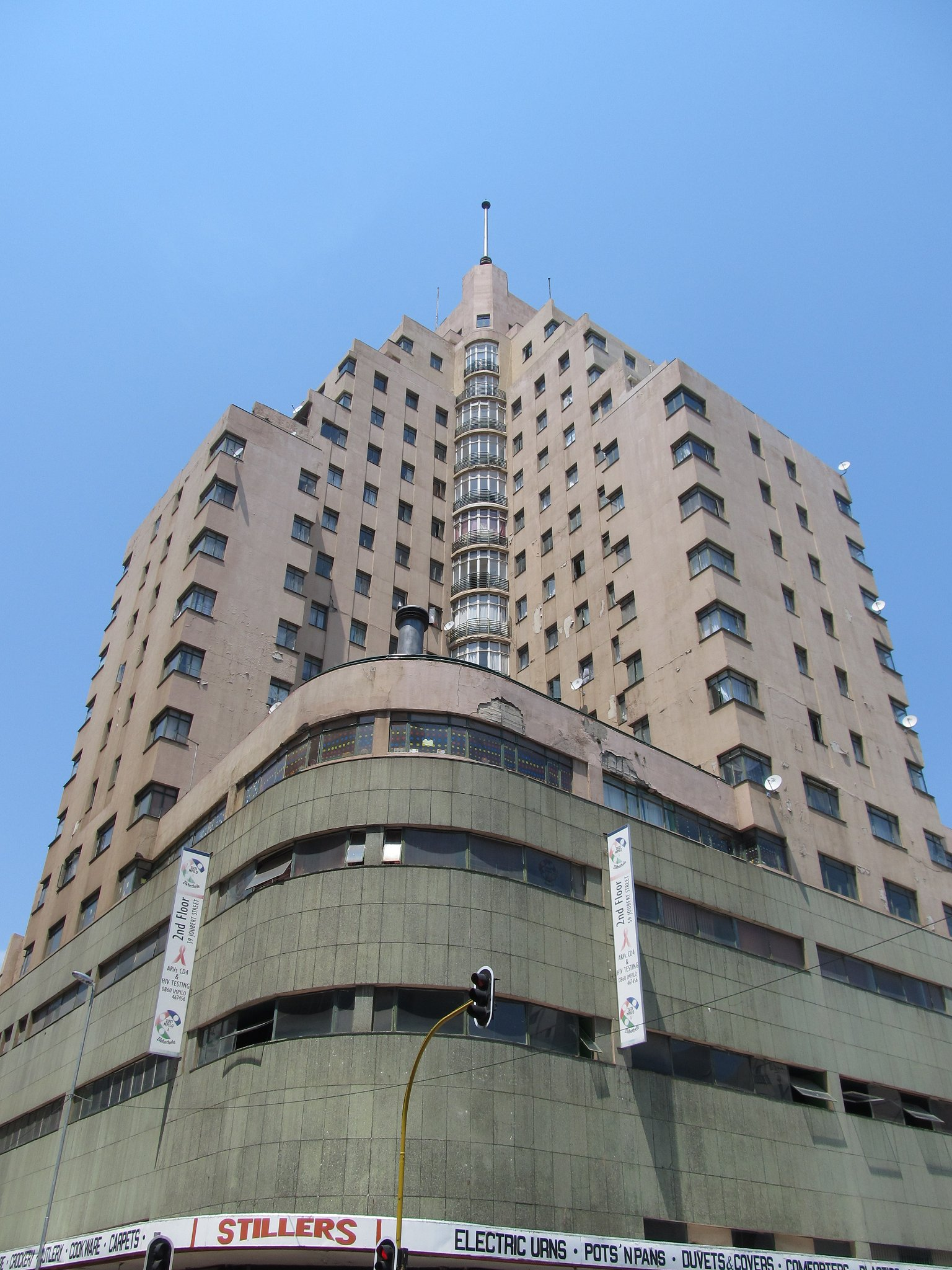
- 59 Joubert Str
- Interactive map of the Anstey's Building area

General information
- Architectural style: Art deco
- Location: 59 Joubert Street, Corner Jeppe Street and Joubert Street, Johannesburg, South Africa
- Coordinates: 26°12′07″S 28°02′33″E
- Construction started: 1935
- Completed: 1937
- Client: Norman Anstey & Company
- Owner: Sectional Title

Height
- Height: 77 m (253 ft)

Technical details
- Floor count: 20

Design and construction
- Architects: Emley & Williamson
- Main contractor: Reid & Knuckley (Pty) Ltd
- 100

Anstey's Building is an art deco building in the city of Johannesburg. The building took its name from the original owner of the building, Norman Anstey, founder of one of the best known department stores in the city (and mayor from 1913 to 1915). The Norman Anstey and Company department store was housed in the four-storey podium of the building, which features a curved facade to address the street corner.

== History ==
This is the third Anstey's building. The first was demolished, and the second is still standing, directly across the road on the corner of Kerk and Joubert Streets.

Anstey's Building was designed by architectural firm Emley & Williamson and was built in 1935, completed in 1937. It is situated in stand 118/9/20 on the corner of Joubert and Jeppe Streets in Johannesburg. Standing 20 storeys high, the building is one of Johannesburg's landmark high-rise buildings from the Art Deco era.

=== Recent history ===
The building faced demolition in 1989 but was saved by the developer's architect who refused to apply for demolition. A Preservation Trust was established, owning the ground floor podium, and the flats above were sold on sectional title. The refurbishment of Anstey's commenced in January 1994 under the direction of the architect Denzil Hersch. The building has a diverse demographic and it has become a popular place for young middle-class people to live in town. The building is also home to a medical centre, a creche and also the Urban Arts Platform, an initiative to encourage city residents to engage in arts of all forms.

The building is currently undergoing refurbishment and restoration under the guidance of architect Brian Kent McKechnie. The project includes the renovation of public areas and the ground floor Art Deco lobby. The exterior renovation and restoration will see Anstey's painted grey by 2017.

== Description ==
The building is designed in a dramatic ziggurat style, recessing the top from the street. The building consists of two stepped wings, set at right angles to each other, with corner flats featuring bay window balconies.

The stepped, right angle design necessitated by the 59 degrees bylaw had resulted in the beautiful large terraces for which Anstey's was well known, while the cylindrical glazed windows at the re-entrant level had provided interesting, unusual detail.

Constructed in reinforced concrete, Anstey's Building features Crittal-Hope steel windows and doors. Decorative bronze and chrome grilles were fabricated by Frederick Sage & Co (SA) Ltd. The building was painted with ‘Snowcem’ paint in the early 1950s.

The Anstey's department store featured large plate glass windows to the ground floor street frontage, and their window displays were renowned. Internally, the building was designed to have a minimal number of structural pillars so as to provide good views through the store. The interior featured high quality parquet flooring, traditional timber doors and timber detailing such as picture rails.

== Heritage Status ==
The Anstey's Building is a provincial heritage site and is historically and culturally significant for the following reasons:

- Anstey's Building is a good example of Art Deco architecture in Johannesburg
- Anstey's Building is one of the older high rise buildings in the city
- Anstey's Building is associated with the architectural firm of Emley & Williamson
- Anstey's Building is associated with The Norman Anstey and Company department store
- It is a landmark building in Johannesburg
- It is related to Manners Mansions directly across the road and was designed by the same architect
