= Caerleon =

Town and community in Newport, Wales

Caerleon: Welsh: Caerllion
- Town
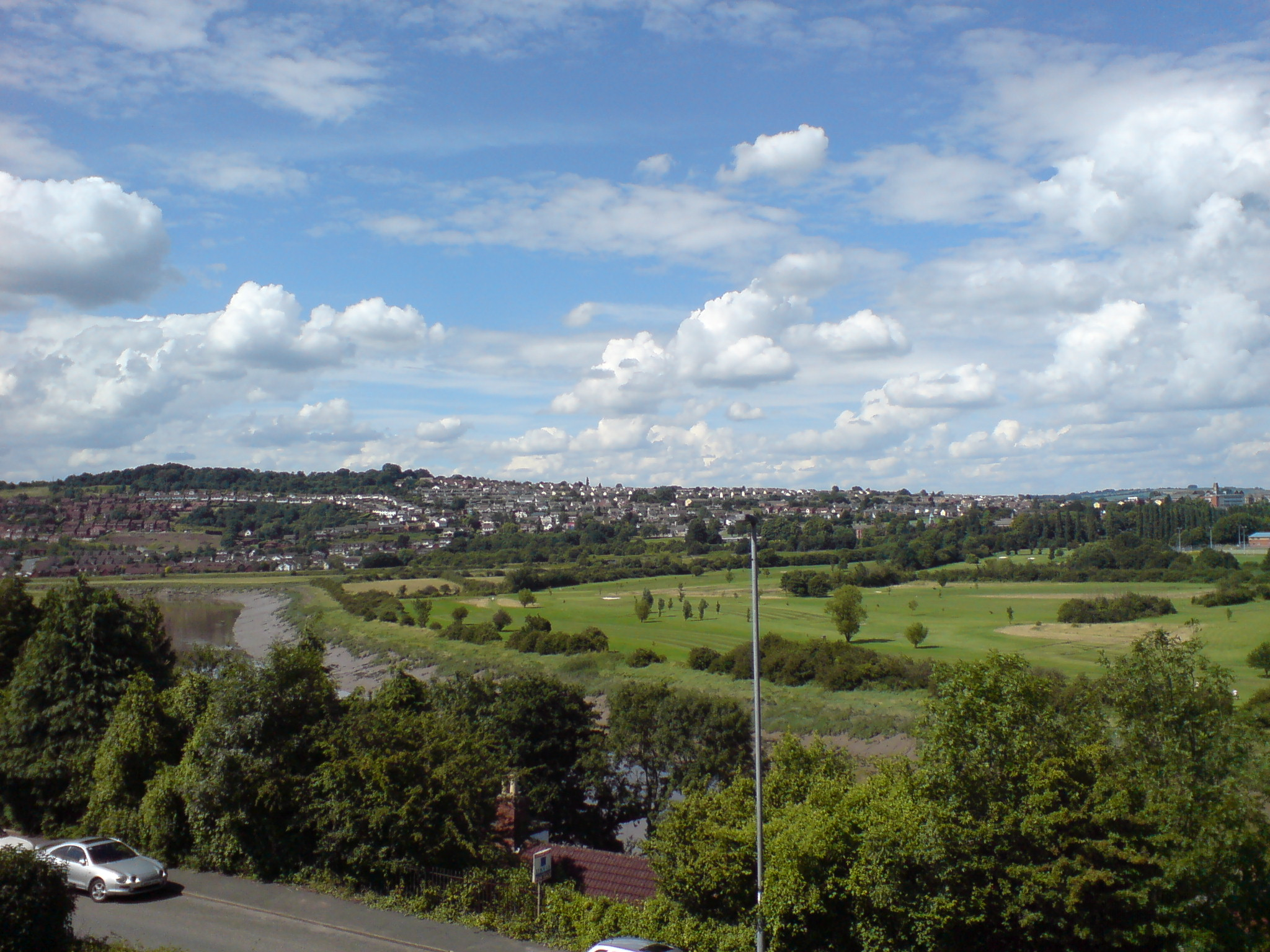
- Caerleon from St Julians

- Location within Newport
- Area: 9.03 sq mi (23.4 km^{2})
- Population: 8,061
  - Density: 893/sq mi (345/km2)
- Demonym: Caerleonite
- OS grid reference: ST336909
  - Cardiff: 13 mi (21 km) westwards
  - London: 122 mi (196 km) eastwards
- Community: Caerleon
- Principal area: Newport
- Preserved county: Gwent
- Country: Wales
- Sovereign state: United Kingdom
- Post town: NEWPORT
- Postcode district: NP18
- Dialling code: 01633
- Police: Gwent
- Fire: South Wales
- Ambulance: Welsh
- UK Parliament: Newport East
- Senedd Cymru – Welsh Parliament: Newport West
- Website: council website
- List of places UK Wales Newport 51°36′37″N 2°57′21″W Map of the community

Caerleon (/kərˈliːən/ kər-LEE-ən; Welsh: Caerllion) is a town and community in Newport, Wales. Situated on the River Usk, it lies 5 miles (8 km) northeast of Newport city centre, and 5.5 miles (9 km) southeast of Cwmbran. Caerleon is of archaeological importance, being the site of a notable Roman legionary fortress, Isca Augusta, and an Iron Age hillfort. Close to the remains of Isca Augusta are the National Roman Legion Museum and the Roman Baths Museum. The town also has strong historical and literary associations: Geoffrey of Monmouth elevated the significance of Caerleon as a major centre of British history in his Historia Regum Britanniae (c. 1136), and Alfred Lord Tennyson wrote Idylls of the King (1859–1885) while staying in Caerleon.

== History ==
=== Pre-Roman history ===
The area around Caerleon is of considerable archaeological interest, with a number of important Neolithic sites. By the Iron Age, the area was home to the powerful Silures tribe and appears to have been the centre of a wealthy trading network, both manufacturing and importing La Tène style goods. From the 5th century BC, the town was the location of a great Iron Age hillfort crowning a hill overlooking the River Usk and what would become the Roman port. The hillfort at Lodge Wood Camp is defended by three lines of massive ramparts and ditches, and is the largest fortified enclosure in South Wales.

The excavation in 2000 found that the hillfort had been continuously occupied from its founding in the 5th century BC until the construction and occupation of Isca Augusta (also called Isca Silurum) around 78 AD. There is no evidence that the fort was taken militarily, and the abandonment of the fort may have been part of the terms of peace. The fort was reoccupied during the Roman period and remained in use following the end of Roman rule in Britain, suggesting that some version of the Pre-Roman society survived the occupation.

=== Roman era ===
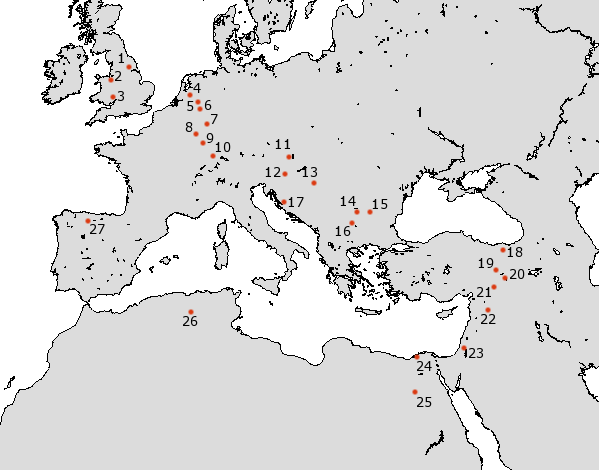
A map of Roman legionary camps in Europe with Caerleon (3) noted

Caerleon is the location of a Roman legionary fortress or castra. It was the headquarters for Legio II Augusta from about 75 to 300 AD, and on the hill above was the site of an Iron Age hillfort. The Romans called the site Isca after the River Usk (Welsh Wysg). The name Caerleon may derive from the Welsh for "fortress of the legion"; around 800 AD it was referred to as Cair Legeion guar Uisc.

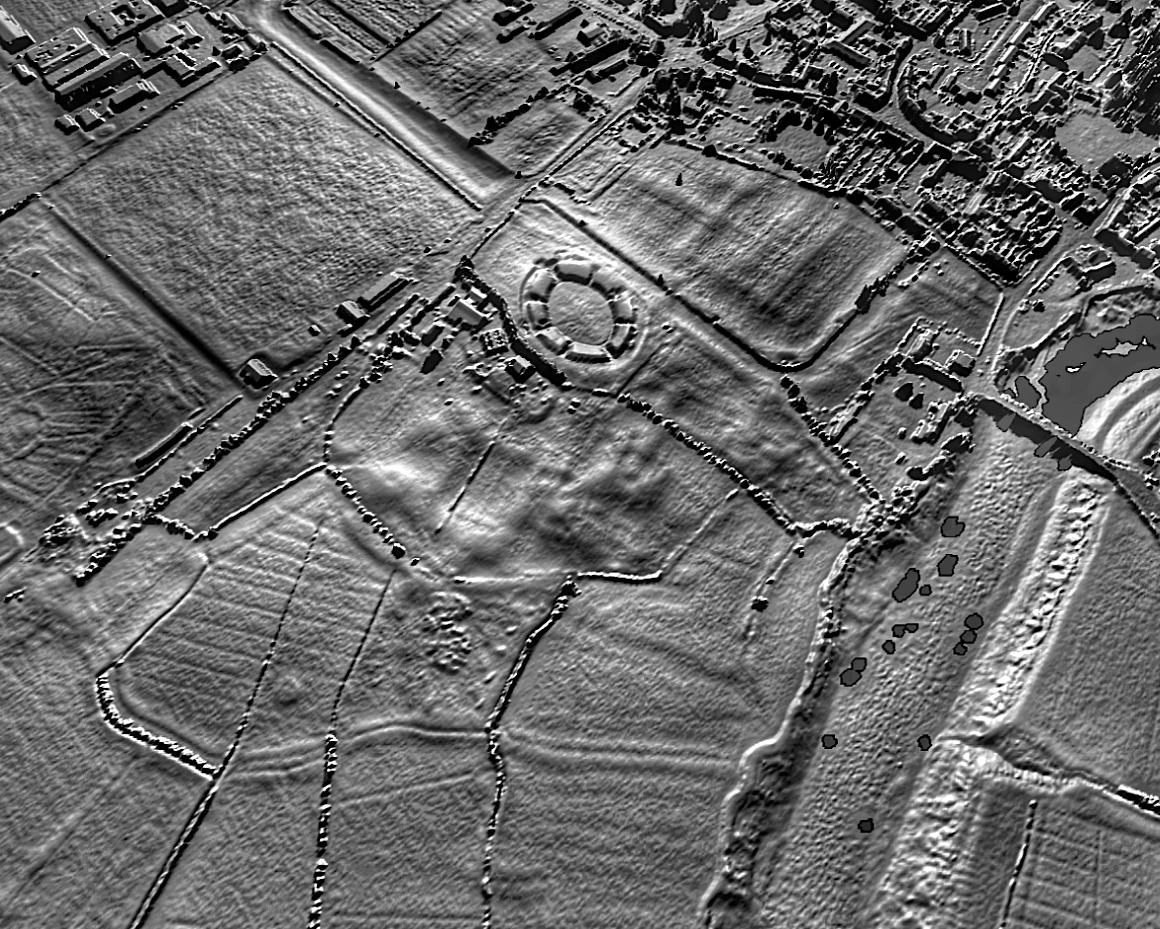
A lidar view of the amphitheatre and the surrounding archaeological features.

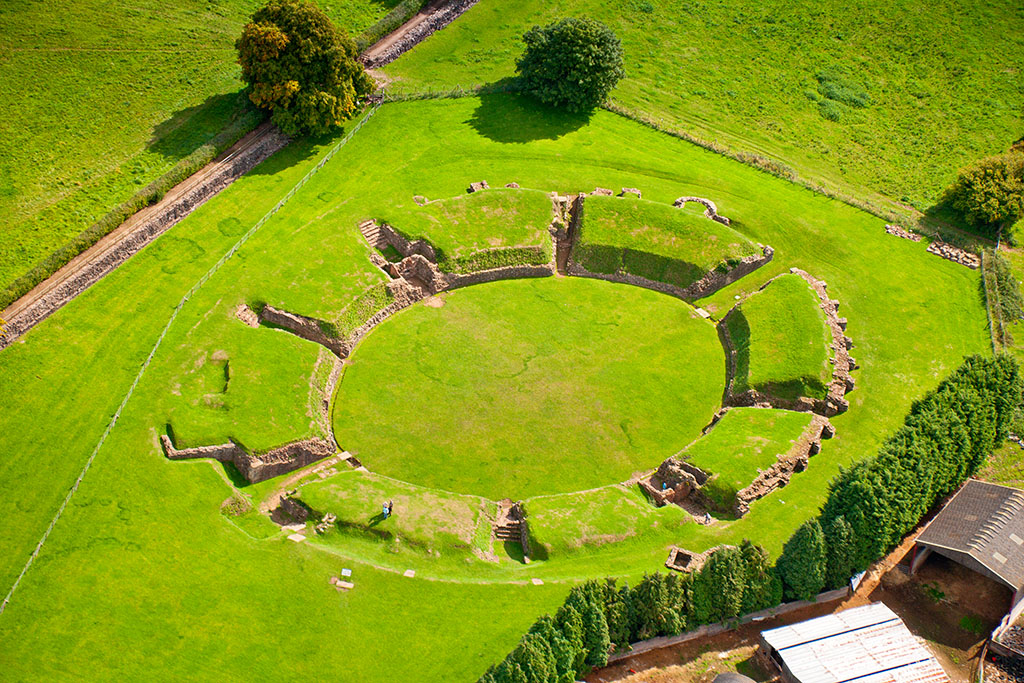
An aerial view of Caerleon's Roman amphitheatre site in 2005

Substantial excavated Roman remains can be seen, including the military amphitheatre, thermae (baths) and barracks occupied by the Roman legion. In August 2011 the remains of a Roman harbour were discovered in Caerleon. According to Gildas, followed by Bede, Roman Caerleon was the site of two early Christian martyrdoms, those of Julius and Aaron. Recent finds suggest Roman occupation of some kind as late as AD 380. Roman remains have also been discovered at The Mynde, itself a distinctive historical site.

=== Middle Ages ===
Caerleon features extensively in Medieval Welsh literature and Welsh Mythology, often as a model city against which other settlements are compared. When discussing the disastrous flooding of Cantre'r Gwaelod in the time of Ambrosius Aurelianus, the author of the Triads of the Island of Britain notes that Medieval Caerleon is an exceptional city, "superior to all the towns and fortifications in Cambria".

Medieval Caerleon would remain an important administrative and religious centre for the Kingdom of Gwent, and was an early Metropolitan See associated with Saint Dubricius (who is commonly depicted with two crosiers, signifying the Bishoprics of Caerleon and Llandaff). At the Synod of Brefi in 545 AD, Dubricius is said to have given the See of Caerleon to Saint David, who would later move the seat to Mynyw. Caerleon was also the location of the Synod of Victory, officiated by Saint David around 569 AD.

Another medieval saint, Cadoc, is associated with the church built over the principia (legionary headquarters). Saint Cadoc's Church, is one of many churches associated with Cadoc's travels, and may have been the location of a monastic cell in the 6th century.

=== Norman era ===
A Norman-style motte and bailey castle was built outside the eastern corner of the old Roman fort, possibly by the Welsh Lord of Caerleon, Caradog ap Gruffydd. The Domesday Book of 1086 recorded that a small colony of eight carucates of land (about 1.5 square miles) in the jurisdiction of Caerleon, seemingly just within the Welsh Lordship of Gwynllwg, was held by Turstin FitzRolf, standard bearer to William the Conqueror at Hastings, subject to William d'Ecouis, a magnate of unknown antecedents with lands in Hereford, Norfolk and other counties. Also listed on the manor were three Welshmen with as many ploughs and carucates, who continued their Welsh customs (leges Walensi viventes). Caerleon itself may have remained in Welsh hands, or may have changed hands frequently.

From the apparent banishment of Turstin by William II, Turstin's lands were transferred in 1088 by Wynebald de Ballon, brother of Hamelin de Ballon who held Abergavenny further up the River Usk. At about the same time, Wynebald's lands may have passed via his daughter to Henry Newmarch, possible illegitimate son of Bernard de Newmarch, In c. 1155 the Welsh Lord of Caerleon, Morgan ab Owain, grandson of King Caradog ap Gruffudd, was recognized by Henry II. Subsequently, Caerleon remained in Welsh hands, subject to occasional battles with the Normans. Caerleon was an important market and port and possibly became a borough by 1171, although no independent charters exist. In 1171 Iorwerth ab Owain and his two sons destroyed the town of Caerleon and burned the castle. Both castle and borough were seized by William Marshal from Morgan ap Hywel in 1217 and Caerleon castle was rebuilt in stone. The remains of many of the old Roman buildings stood to some height until this time and were probably demolished for their building materials.

=== Glyndŵr Rising ===
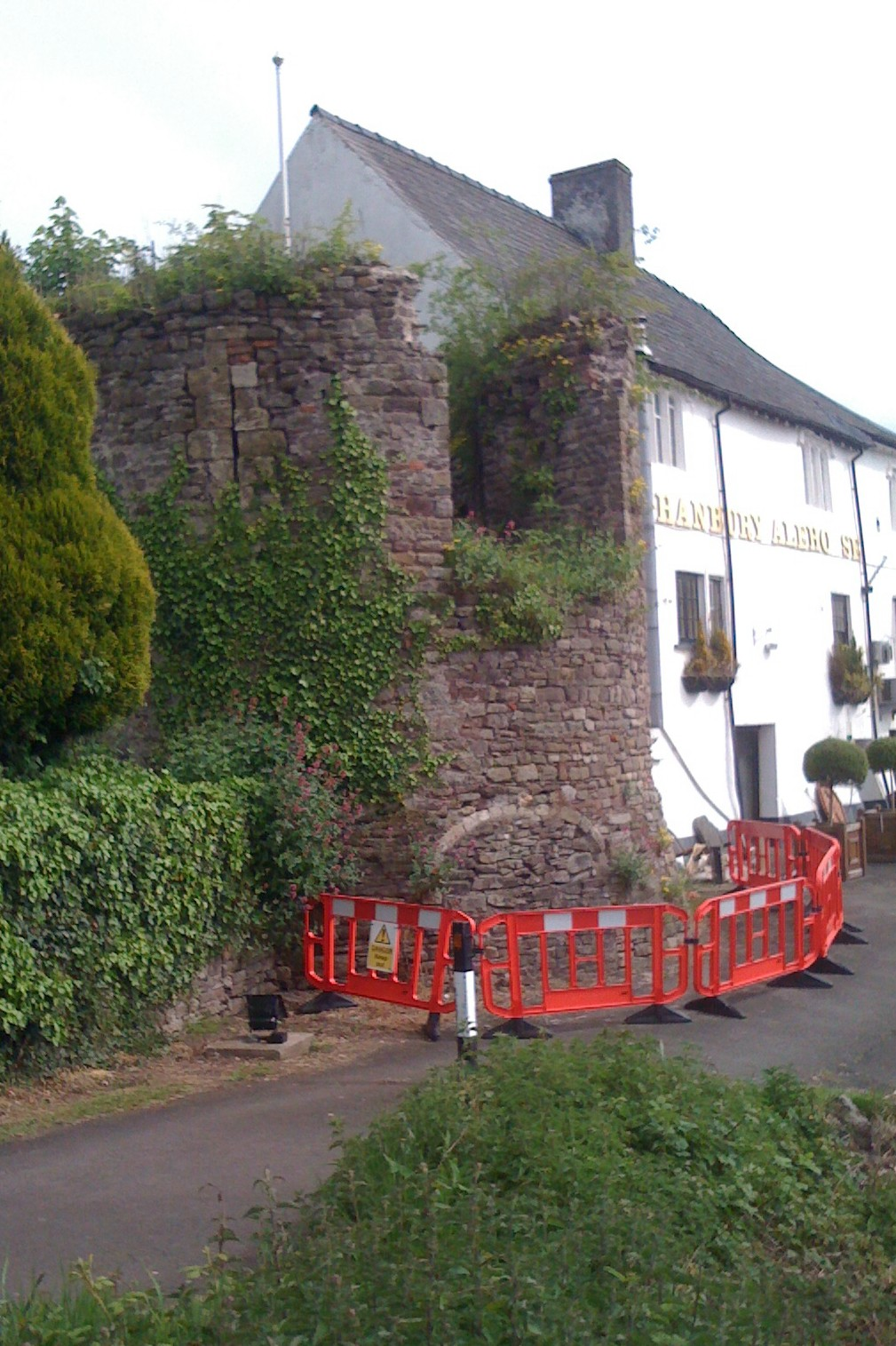
Round Tower at The Hanbury Arms in 2010

During the Glyndŵr Rising in 1402 Rhys Gethin, general for Owain Glyndŵr, took Caerleon castle by force, together with those of Newport, Cardiff, Llandaff, Abergavenny, Caerphilly and Usk. This was probably the last time Caerleon castle was ruined, though the walls were still standing in 1537 and the castle ruins only finally collapsed in 1739: their most obvious remnant is the Round Tower at the Hanbury Arms public house. The Tower is a Grade II* listed building.

=== English Civil War ===
Across the Afon Lwyd from Caerleon, in the region of Penrhos Farm, are two Civil War forts. In 1648 Oliver Cromwell's troops camped overnight on Christchurch Hill, overlooking Newport, before their attack on Newport Castle the next day.

=== 18th and 19th centuries ===
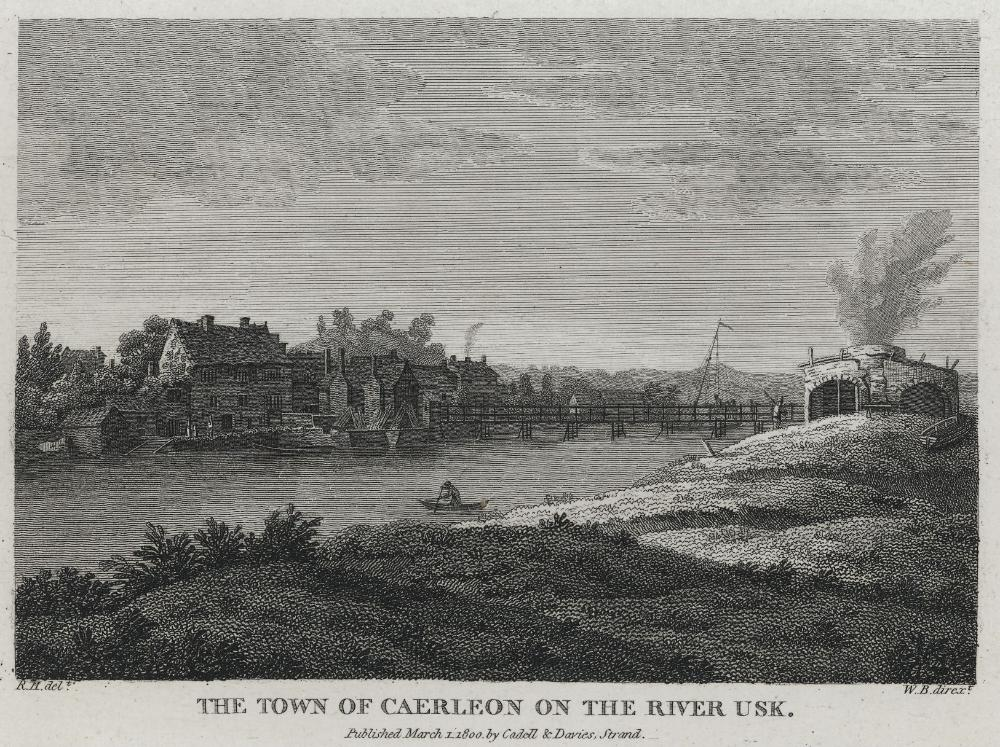
Caerleon in 1800, from the south and showing the bridge

The old wooden bridge was destroyed in a storm in 1779 and the present stone bridge was erected in the early 19th century. Until the Victorian development of the downstream docks at Newport Docks, Caerleon acted as the major port on the River Usk. The wharf was located on the right bank, to the west of today's river bridge which marked the limit of navigability for masted ships. A tinplate works and mills were established on the outskirts of the town, in Ponthir, around this time, and Caerleon expanded to become almost joined to Newport. A plaque on the Mynde wall in High Street references the Newport Rising of 1839 in which John Frost of Newport was a prominent figure in the Chartist movement. John Jenkins, owner of Mynde House and owner of Ponthir Tinplate Works, built the wall to keep demonstrators out. The name of the former Drovers' Arms on Goldcroft Common bore witness to the ancient drovers' road on the old road from Malpas. It is thought that the common itself was once the site of a cattle market.

=== Modern histories ===
A history of Caerleon was published in 1970 by local amateur historian Primrose Hockey MBE, who was a founder member of Caerleon Local History Society. An archive of her local history collection is kept by the Gwent Record Office.

== In Welsh mythology and literature ==
=== Welsh mythology ===
Caerleon features frequently in various works connected with Welsh mythology and Medieval Welsh literature.

In book three of his Historia Regum Britanniæ, Geoffrey of Monmouth gives the founder of the city as Belinus, the mythical King of the Britons. According to Geoffrey, Belinus repaired and founded many cities during a period of great wealth; he named this city "Caerosc" (The Caer on the Usk), and it became the most important of all the new cities he founded. Geoffrey also states that Belinus' son and heir, Gurguit Barbtruc was buried in Caerleon, which he fortified with walls and ornamented with new buildings.

Caerleon is also associated the legends around Dubricius and Saint David, and was commonly believed to be one of the earliest Metropolitan Sees in the Province of Britannia. In the Prophetiae Merlini, Geoffrey stated that "St David's shall put on the pall of the City of Legions"; and most accounts state that Dubricius gave the see of Caerleon to St David voluntarily. David then translated the bishopric to Mynyw (known today as St David's). Indeed in describing St David's death, Geoffrey describes him as "The pious archbishop of Legions, at the city of Menevia (Mynyw)."

=== Arthurian legend ===
In his 1191 Itinerarium Cambriae, written about Archbishop Baldwin's 1188 tour of Wales to recruit for the Third Crusade, the author Gerald of Wales says of Caerleon, "the Roman ambassadors here received their audience at the court of the great king Arthur."

Early Welsh poetry and Geoffrey named Caerleon as Arthur's capital and Thomas Malory has Arthur re-crowned there. The still extant amphitheatre at Caerleon has been associated with Arthur's 'Round Table; and has been suggested as a possible source for the legend. But it shows no sign of 6th-century occupation here.

For it was located in a delightful spot in Glamorgan, on the River Usk, not far from the Severn Sea. Abounding in wealth more than other cities, it was suited for such a ceremony. For the noble river I have named flows along it on one side, upon which the kings and princes who would be coming from overseas could be carried by ship. But on the other side, protected by meadow and woods, it was remarkable for royal palaces, so that it imitated Rome in the golden roofs of its buildings ... Famous for so many pleasant features, Caerleon was made ready for the announced feast. (Historia Regum Britanniae)

The huge scale of the ruins, along with Caerleon's importance as an urban centre in early medieval Kingdom of Gwent remembered in Gildas, may have inspired Geoffrey. The most famous "Camelot" first appears in Chrétien de Troyes' Lancelot, though Chrétien still mentions Caerleon.

However the battle of Arthur in "the camp of the legion" found in the 9th-century Historia Brittonum may be a conflation of "urbs legionis" with Chester alluding to its Saxon name Legacester, which Bede and Nennius retrotranlated mistakenly as Caer Legion. This was the site of a historic battle of 613. This battle site has also been proposed to be York.

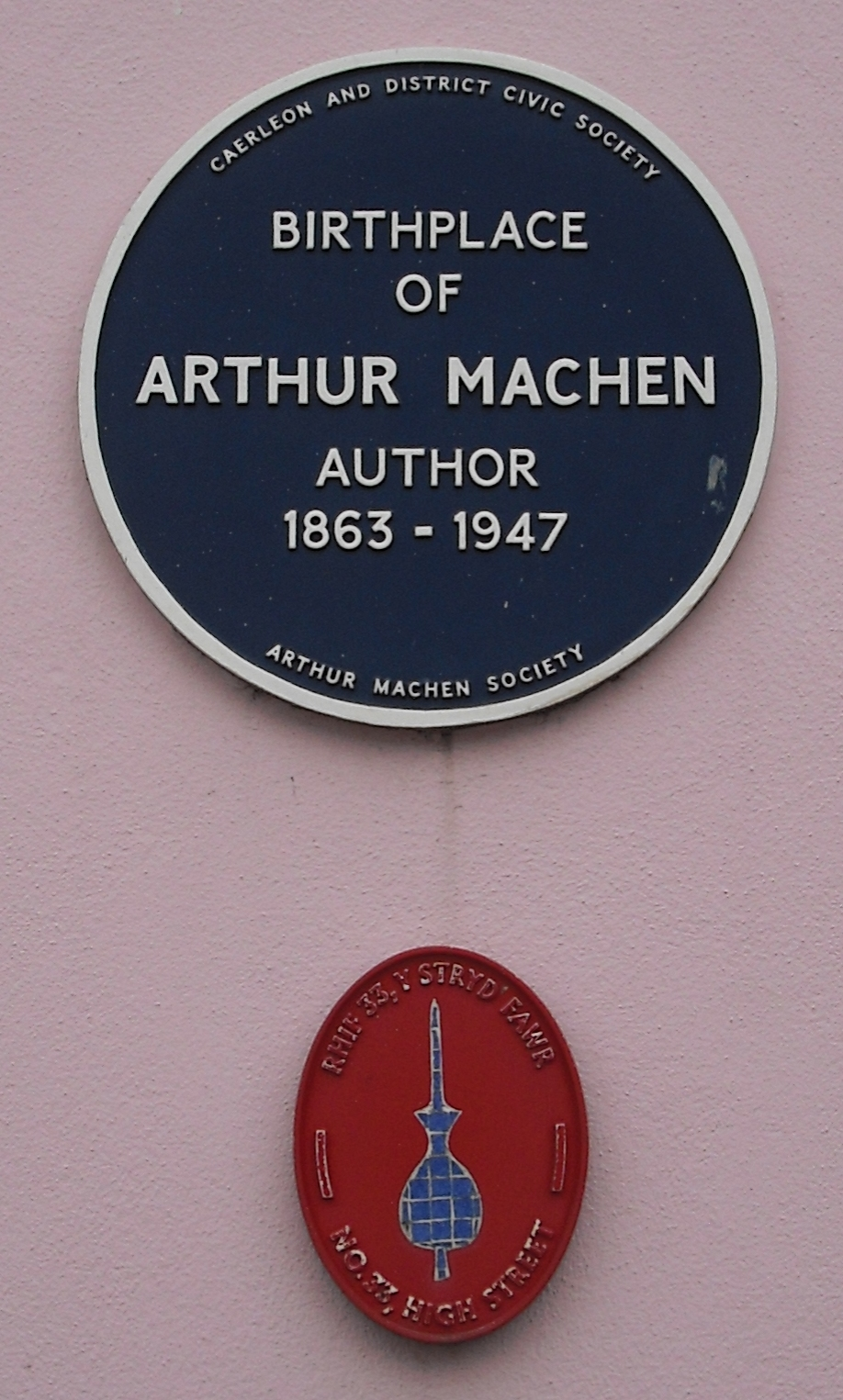
Plaque at birthplace of Arthur Machen, The Square, High Street

Caerleon also has associations with later Arthurian literature as the birthplace of the writer Arthur Machen who often used it as a location in his work. Alfred Tennyson lodged at The Hanbury Arms while he wrote his Morte d'Arthur (later incorporated into his Idylls of the King). Today Caerleon has a modern statue of a knight, "The Hanbury Knight", in reflecting stainless steel by Belgian sculptor Thierry Lauwers. In Michael Morpurgo's novel Arthur, High King of Britain, Caerleon is the castle where Arthur unknowingly commits incest with his half-sister Morgaine, resulting in the conception of his son Mordred who will later bring about his downfall. Mary Stewart's account of the Arthurian legends also mentions Caerleon as a place where Arthur held court. In that telling, the incest took place at Luguvalium.

== Modern Caerleon ==
=== Overview ===
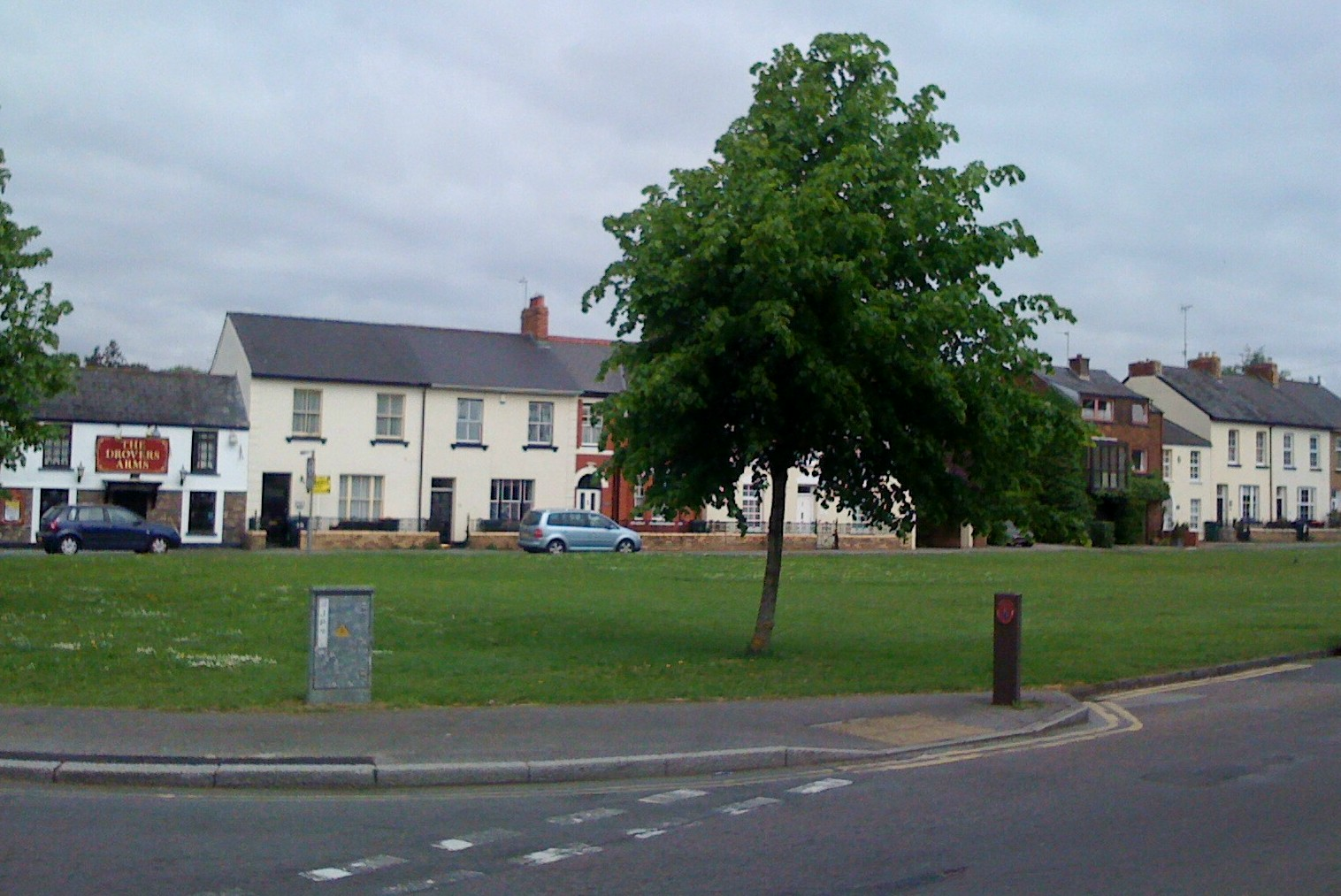
Goldcroft Common in 2010

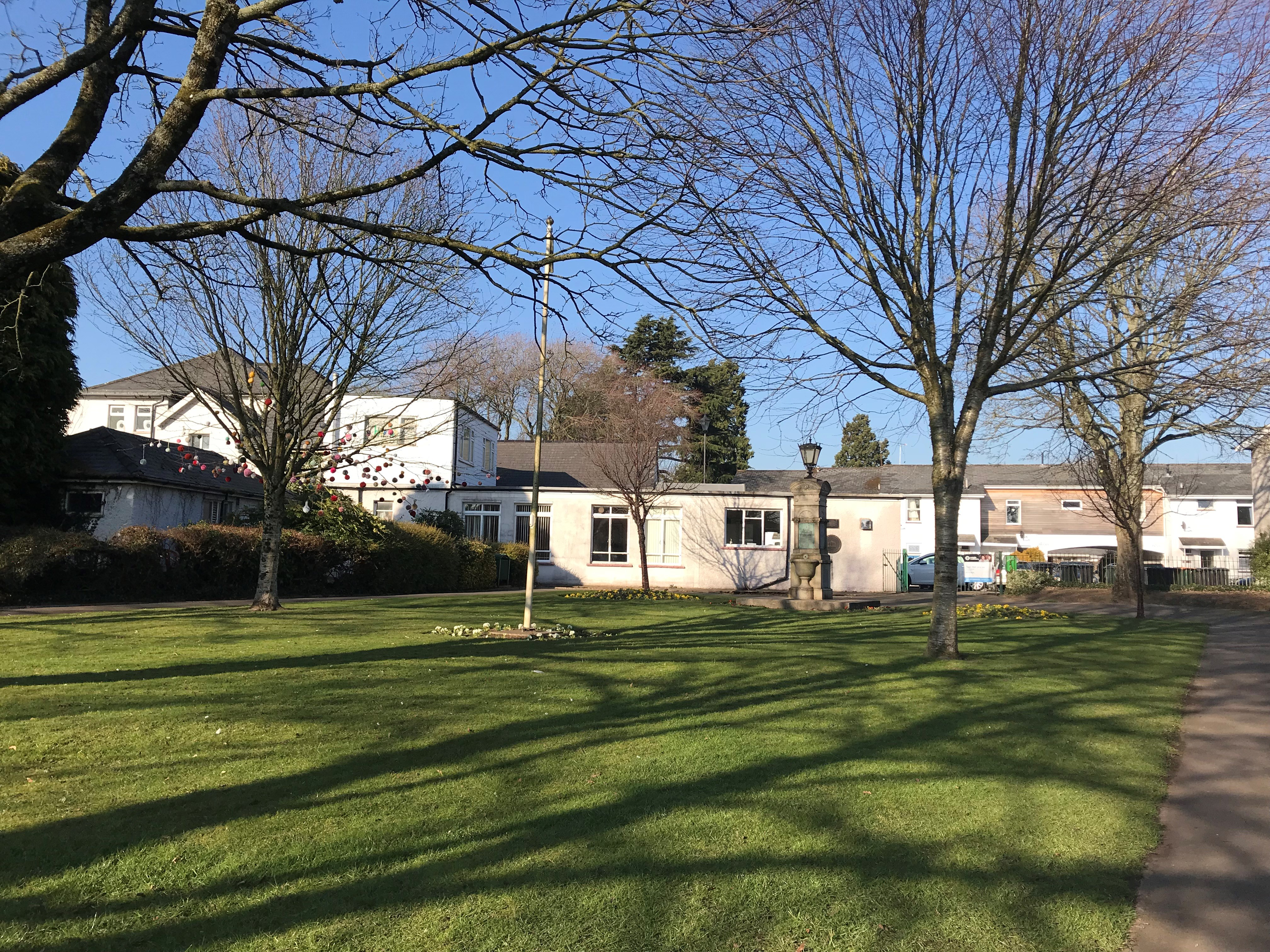
The War Memorial Garden, erected 1921 for the 1914–1918 Great War and later the 1939-1945 Second World War.

Caerleon is centred around a small common. Goldcroft Common is the only remaining of the seven commons of Caerleon. Most of the small businesses of Caerleon are near the common as is the Town Hall which has a World War I and World War II memorial garden. Caerleon library is located within the Town Hall and is associated with Newport Central Library. The intersection of High Street and Cross Street is known as The Square.

Buildings of note are Saint Cadoc's Church, the National Roman Legion Museum, the Roman Baths Museum, The Mynde, The Priory Hotel, Caerleon Catholic Church and Rectory, Caerleon Endowed School, the Round Tower, the Toll House at Caerleon Bridge, The Malt House, former University of South Wales and the University of Wales, Newport - Caerleon Campus and St Cadoc's Hospital. There are 86 listed buildings in Caerleon.

The historic remains of the Roman Legionary Fortress Isca Augusta is popular with tourists and school parties and there is a marked heritage trail in the town. The Millennium Wildlife Garden is a small nature garden on the banks of the River Usk. The hilltop vantage point at Christchurch provides panoramic views of the Vale of Usk and Bristol Channel.

The municipal playing fields are at Caerleon Broadway and a children's playground is in Cold Bath Road. Private sport and leisure facilities are available at the Celtic Manor. Caerleon has a few restaurants, cafés and take-away food outlets and many public houses that have restaurant facilities. Ffwrrwm Arts and Crafts Centre is a small specialist shopping courtyard with a gallery restaurant and an eclectic display of sculpture.

=== Governance ===
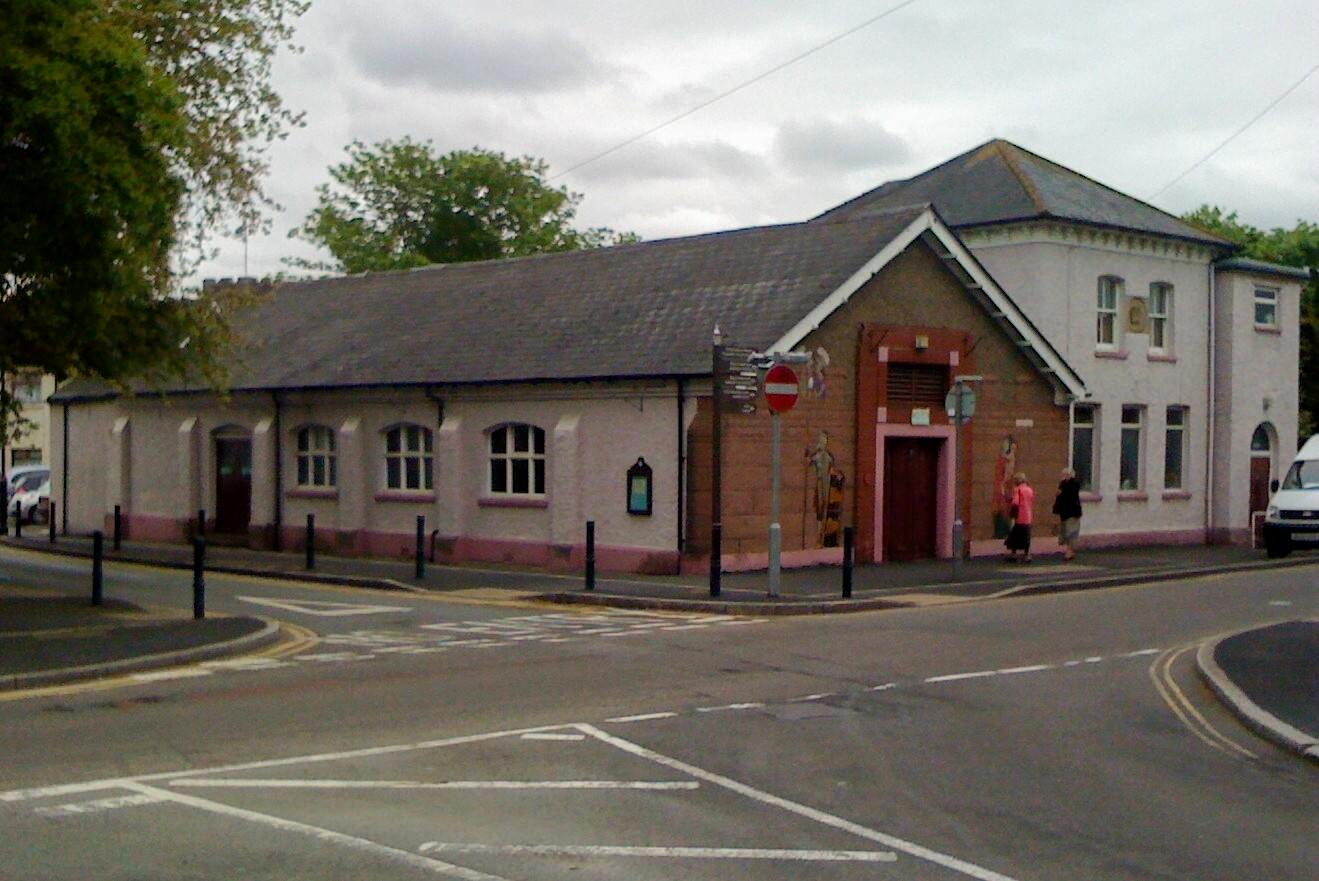
Caerleon Town Hall in 2010

Until January 2020 Caerleon was within the Wales European Parliament Constituency.

Caerleon is an electoral ward of Newport City Council, represented since 1995 by three councillors. The ward includes Christchurch and Bulmore. Caerleon is within the UK Parliamentary constituency of Newport East, the Senedd constituency of Newport West.

The community includes Christchurch and the Afon Gardens area of Ponthir.

=== Geography ===
The centre of Caerleon sits in the Vale of Usk and the River Usk forms part of the community's southern boundary. In the north-west part of the town, across the railway bridges, the land rises sharply up to Lodge Wood and its hill fort. The community's western boundary is formed by the A4042 road (Heidenheim Drive) and the northern boundary partly by the Malthouse Road and partly by the Afon Llwyd river which flows southwards to the River Usk along the town's eastern side. Across the River Usk from Caerleon, to the south-east and east, St Julian's Park, the village of Christchurch and the upland region around Christchurch Hill as far as the M4 motorway and the A449 road are also within the community, along with the hamlet of Ultra Pontem.

=== Transportation ===
==== Road ====
Caerleon is 3.5 miles (5.6 km) from Newport city centre and 5.5 miles (8.9 km) from Cwmbran. Caerleon is 2 miles (3.2 km) north of the M4 motorway. The B4596 (Caerleon Road) links Newport city centre to Caerleon via M4 Junction 25, crossing Caerleon Bridge into Caerleon High Street. The B4236 (Ponthir Road) links Caerleon to Cwmbran. The Usk Road links Caerleon to Usk.

A regular bus service links Caerleon to Newport city centre and Cwmbran. There is a limited City Sightseeing open-top bus service in summer months. A cycle and pedestrian walkway alongside the River Usk links Caerleon to Malpas and Newport city centre at Crindau, route 88 of the National Cycle Network.

==== Rail ====
Trains pass through Caerleon on the Welsh Marches Line, but do not stop at the closed Caerleon railway station. The nearest stations are Newport, and Cwmbran. Transport for Wales have announced that Caerleon is a potential future station as part of the South Wales Metro project.

=== Education ===
Schools in Caerleon generally teach in English, with Welsh being taught as a second language. Welsh-medium education is provided at schools elsewhere in Newport. There are two primary schools in Caerleon: Charles Williams Church in Wales Primary School (one of the largest Church Primary Schools in Wales) and Lodge Hill Primary School. Welsh-medium primary education is provided at Ysgol Gymraeg Bro Teyrnon in Brynglas, Ysgol Gymraeg Casnewydd in Ringland and Ysgol Gymraeg Ifor Hael in Bettws. Caerleon Comprehensive School provides secondary education through the medium of English. Welsh-medium secondary education is provided at Ysgol Gyfun Gwent Is Coed, a comprehensive school in Duffryn that opened in 2016.

==== Higher education ====
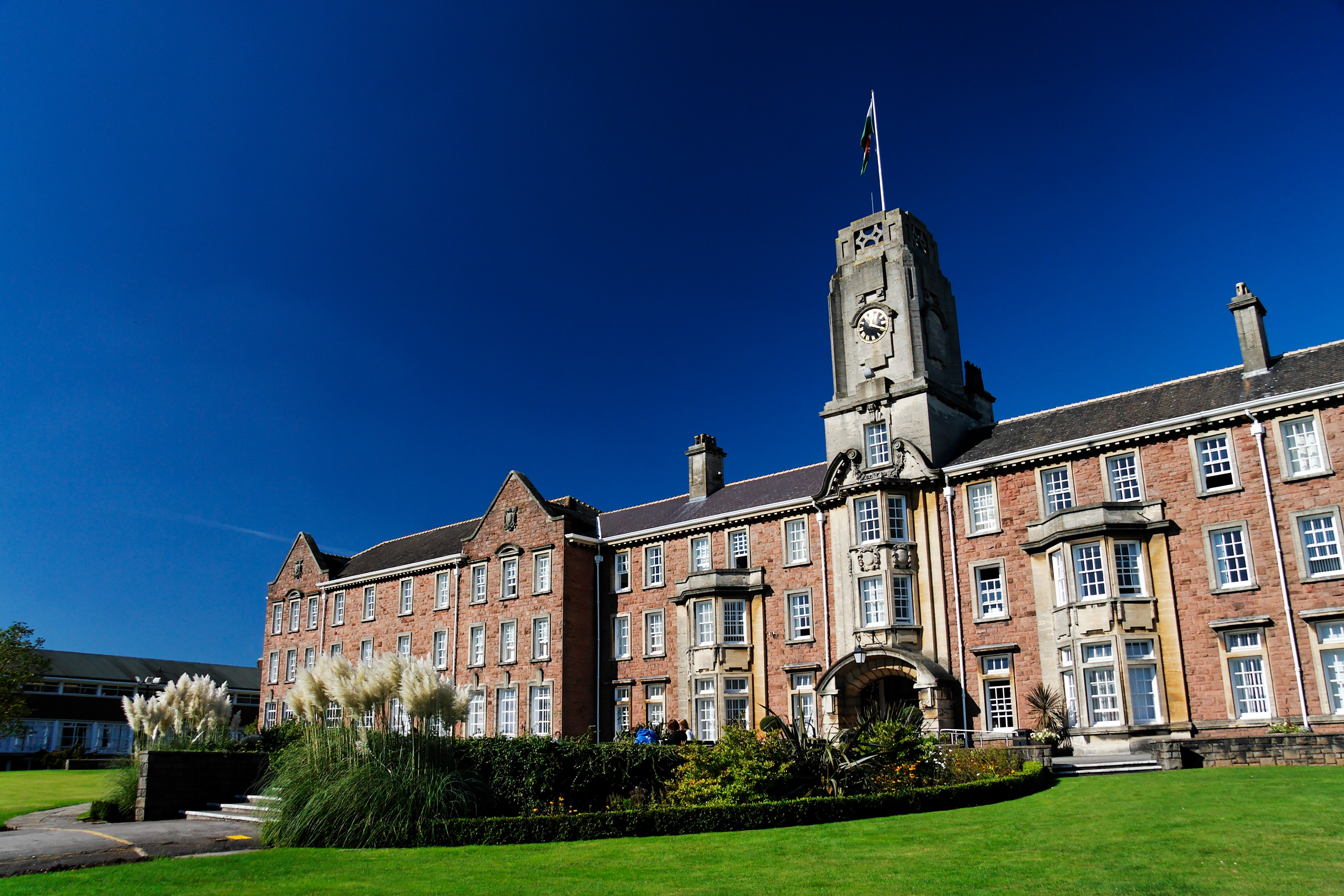
Caerleon Campus in 2007

A campus of the University of South Wales was located in Caerleon. The campus closed on 31 July 2016. The campus was the main campus of the University of Wales, Newport and the second largest campus of the University of South Wales after the merger of universities in 2013. It hosted a variety of undergraduate and postgraduate courses, including education, sports and photography. The campus had extensive sports facilities, library, students' union shop, students' union bar and accommodation blocks.

During September 2014, It the University of South Wales announced that the Caerleon campus would close in 2016 with courses being integrated into the remaining campuses. The University sold the campus for housing development despite strong opposition to the proposed re-development from local residents. The Caerleon Civic Society asked Cadw, the body that looks after historic monuments and buildings in Wales, to give the Edwardian main building Grade II Listed building status to save it from demolition. In August 2016, the Welsh Government announced that they would recommend that the main building, gatehouses and gate piers be listed as 'buildings of special architectural and historic interest'. The University of South Wales expressed their continued opposition to the proposed listing but the announcement was welcomed by local politicians and the Caerleon Civic Society. Grade II listing of the Main Building, the Principal's Residence, Gate Piers and Caretaker's / Gardener's Lodge was confirmed on the 3 March 2017.

=== Housing ===
Historically, housing was largely located on the west bank of the River Usk between Caerleon Bridge and Caerleon Common with a small number of houses on the east bank. A number of substantial housing developments have been created to the west of Caerleon: Lodge Hill, Home Farm, Roman Reach, Trinity View, Brooklea, and the Brades, as well as smaller cluster developments near the centre of the town. Substantial housing developments in nearby Ponthir and Cwmbran have increased traffic congestion in Caerleon.

=== Historic public houses ===
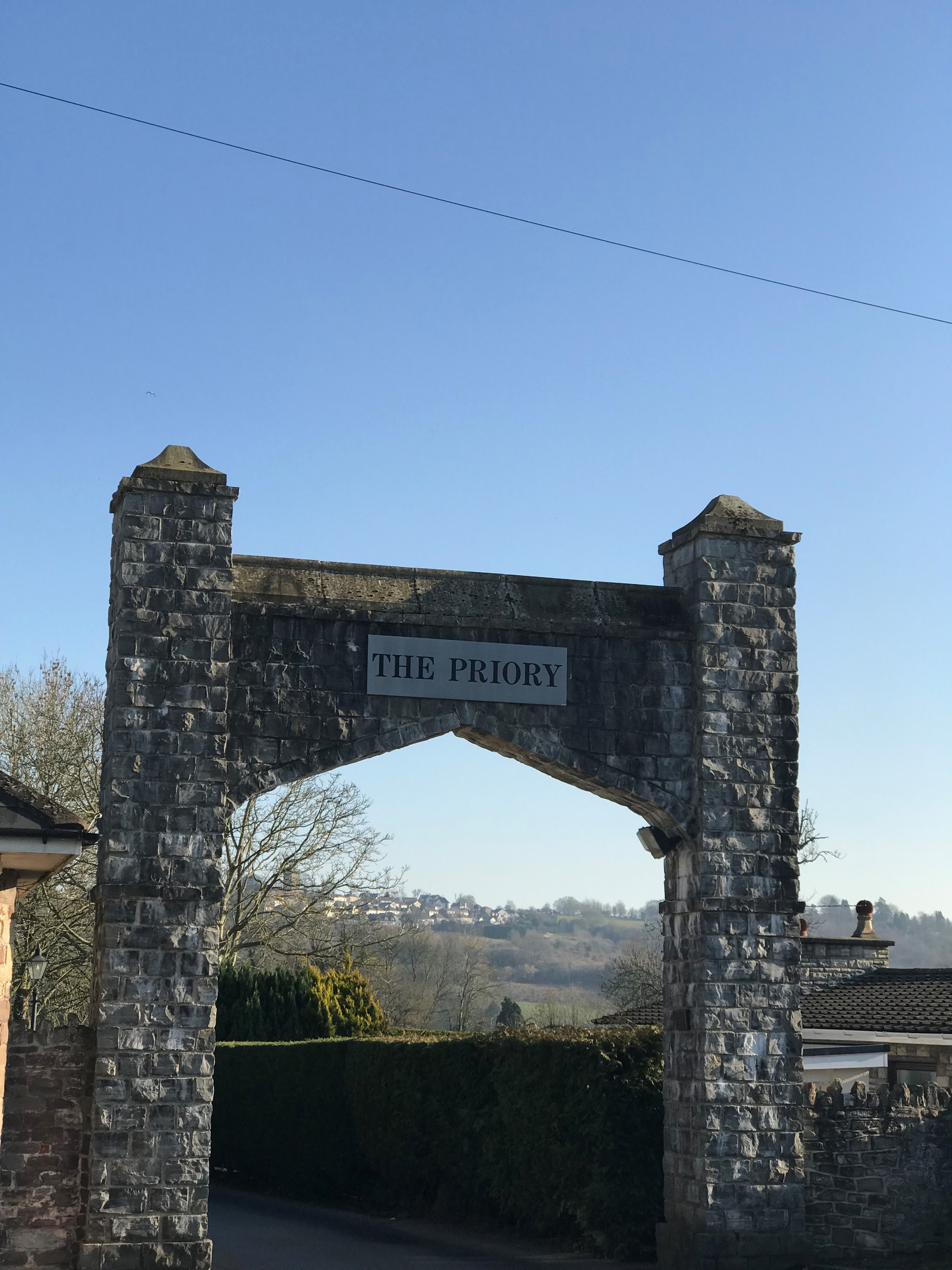
The entrance to The Priory, a historic restaurant and pub in Caerleon, Wales

The town had a number of coaching inns in the early 19th century. A number remain including: The Priory (an abbey was first built here in 1179); the Olde Bull Inn (15th Century); the Hanbury Arms (1565); The Bell (originally built as a chapel in 1814); and the White Hart (a hotel later becoming a pub in 1815).

=== Sport ===
Caerleon has been home to a number of sporting competitions including:

==== Newport Half Marathon ====
It is a part of the Newport Half Marathon route, entering the town via the National Cycle Route 88 path, into the historic village centre past the Amphitheatre, over Caerleon Bridge and onto Caerleon Road back towards the city centre finish.

==== Tour de Gwent ====
On 8 July 2018 the Velothon Wales included Caerleon on a 140 km route, as well as two shorter routes of 125 km and 60 km.

In 2019 it was announced the Velothon Wales would not resume. Instead, the Tour de Gwent will be the main cycling event for South Wales each year, with a 93 mile route and other distances for different ability levels on offer. It will again start in Caerleon and head to Abergavenny, returning to Caerleon via the Wye Valley.

==== Tour of Britain 2017–2018 ====
Caerleon has twice hosted the British national cycling tournament, in 2017 and 2018. It has welcomed international riders including Julian Alaphilippe, André Greipel, Tony Martin, and Geraint Thomas to the popular cycle routes in the area. It includes a category 2 climb at Belmont Hill which has proven popular with organisers.

On 10 September 2017 the Tour of Britain came to Caerleon along the 180.2 km (112 mi) western route from Worcester to the competition's finish in Cardiff city centre. The peak of the British domestic cycling calendar, it saw a dramatic breakaway over Belmont Hill by riders Gorka Izagirre (Movistar) and Mark Stewart (An Post-Chain Reaction) which is a Category 2 climb and has been a feature of the Tour with a 9% average gradient. The riders were only eventually caught by the peloton near Cardiff at the close of the stage. The stage was won by Edvald Boasson Hagen of Team Dimension Data.

On 2 September 2018 Caerleon again hosted the Tour of Britain route as it headed east from Pembrey to Newport, a flat stage of 175 km (109 mi). The event was Welsh Tour de France champion Geraint Thomas' first competition following his success in France, with the route following near his birthplace in Cardiff. The stage was won by André Greipel of Lotto–Soudal. The event organisers sent riders from Newport city centre to Caerleon via Sustrans National Cycle Route 88, which was mostly flat along the Usk riverside. The route passed the Roman fortress towards the countryside around the Celtic Manor Resort, and then into Usk. The King of the Mountains stage was again set at nearby Belmont Hill, with Tour de France winner Thomas famously describing the climb as 'too steep' after he lost lead position in the peloton to climber Alaphilippe.

==== 2010 Ryder Cup ====
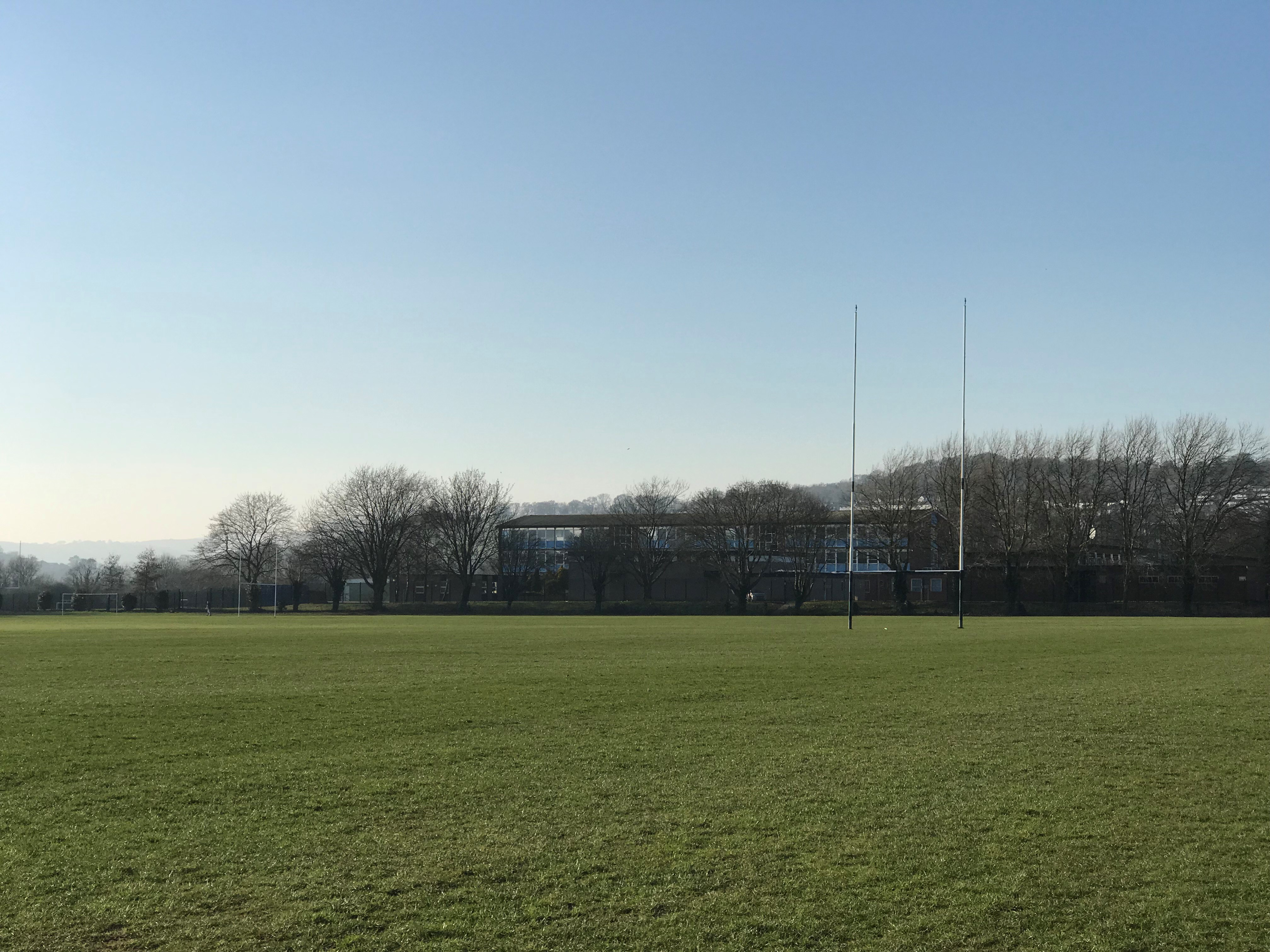
The Cricket Pavilion in Caerleon, Wales. In the background is Caerleon Comprehensive School.

The local ward golf club was included in promotional material for the 2010 Ryder Cup which was hosted at the nearby Celtic Manor Resort.

Caerleon Golf Club is managed by the Celtic Manor Resort, and is a 9 hole municipal golf course, driving range and golf clubhouse. During winter months the golf course is prone to flooding due to its location alongside the River Usk.

==== Other sports ====
Caerleon Bowls Club has an outdoor green and recently became home of the city's Newport Athletic Bowls Club which moved from Rodney Parade. The association football club Caerleon A.F.C. is based in Caerleon along with two rugby union clubs; Newport High School Old Boys RFC and Caerleon RFC whose grounds are less than a mile apart. Both rugby clubs have large junior sections and Caerleon Junior Youth Football Club is a substantial junior football club. Bulmore Lido was opened in Caerleon in July 1934 land with an open-air swimming pool, cafe and restaurant, closing in the 1980s.

Newport Racecourse at Caerleon staged National Hunt racing from the 1840s until its closure in 1948. It hosted the Welsh Grand National at Easter 1948, the only time the race was held at Newport. Following the closure of the course the Welsh Grand National was transferred to Chepstow. The racecourse also staged the International Cross Country Championships on six occasions between 1906 and 1951. The course was located on what is now the golf club and the comprehensive school.

=== Culture and community ===
==== Caerleon Festival ====
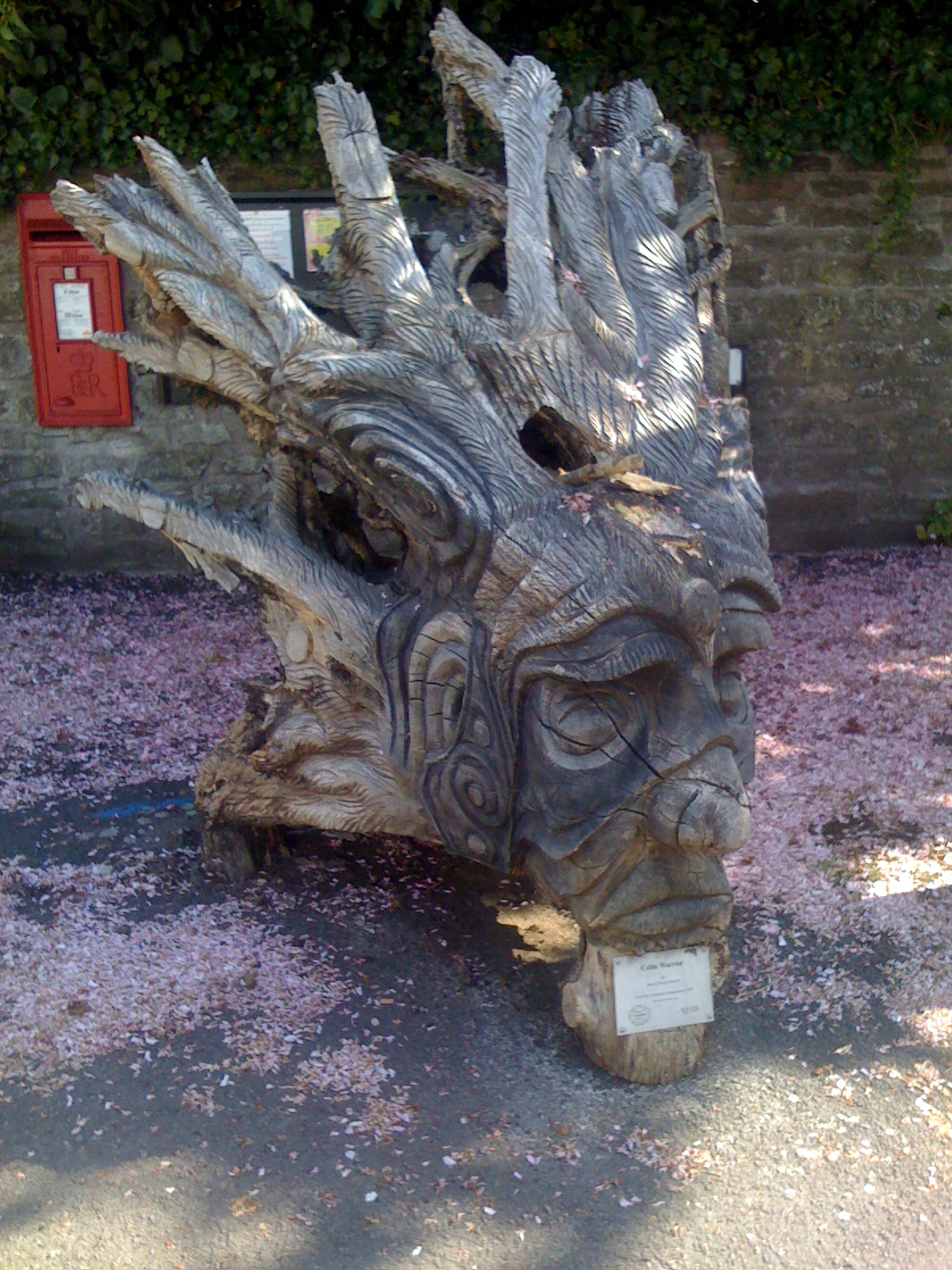
Tree sculpture in Caerleon

Caerleon has hosted an arts festival in July each year since 2003, established initially to welcome participants and sculptors from around the world. Many of the sizeable sculptures are retained around Caerleon as a Sculpture park and local landmarks. The arts festival coincides with the Roman military re-enactment in the amphitheatre which demonstrates Roman military armour, infantry tactics, cavalry tactics, equipment and siege engines such as ballistae. Recent developments with the festival have seen expansion, with the inclusion of a literary festival, food and drink offerings and music events staged at venues including Caerleon Town Hall and St Cadocs Church. The open-air Roman amphitheatre hosts an annual Shakespeare play. The 'Big Free Weekend' alongside the River Usk is two full days of free live music and dance on three stages at the Hanbury Quay, the 17th century Bell Inn marquee and the Festival Meadow marquee. A diverse range of performers are featured including folk, idie, rock, choirs, celtic and international dance. The Festival field hosts displays, performances and vendors of crafts and visual arts.

==== Mari Lwyd ====
Writing in 1951, local historian and folklorist Fred Hando described the traditional journey through Caerleon of the Mari Lwyd or "Venerable Mary", a tradition similar to that of Hoodening found in Kent, Padstow and Cheshire, and involving a man dressed with a horse's skull. The jaw of the skull could be made to move, with the aid of rods. Hando's informant, Gus Sergeant of Bulmoor, reported that the Mari Lwyd had not been seen in the town for at least 20 years, but he was still able to describe it:

We filled the eye-holes with wadding and 'pop alleys' and fixed great ears made of wadding stiffened with cardboard; then we stuck rosettes on the sides of the skull and strung long coloured ribbons as reins.

One man acted as leader of the Mari, holding the ribbons, and then came the Mari itself draped in a white sheet. It was followed by three singers, who sang in Welsh although "they didn't understand the words". On occasion, the procession of the Mari Lwyd would start as far north as Newbridge-on-Usk and proceed through the town, ending as far south as Goldcliff. The party would be invited into houses along the way and given "money and home-made cakes and gallons of beer". Another of Hando's informants provides a description, dated 1841, of the Yuletide tradition:

The custom of chaunting at their neighbours' doors on the Twelfth Night ... on which occasion they are fantastically dressed with ribbons of various colours. One of the party carries a horse's head decorated in the same manner. Representations of trees, to which are appended apples and oranges, are also carried about, and on one of the branches an artificial bird, called "Aderyn Pica Llwyd" (the grey hobgoblin bird) is placed.

== Notable people ==
Notable people who were born, resided or were schooled in Caerleon, include the following:

- John Byrne (1832–1879), Victoria Cross recipient
- Roger Freestone (born 1968), Wales international footballer
- Green Gartside(b.1955), singer in Scritti Politti
- Ashton Hewitt (born 1994), Newport Gwent Dragons player
- Len Hill (1941–2007), footballer and cricketer
- Gary Hocking (1937–1962), motorcycle racer
- Violet Lawrence (1908–2014), in 2010 became Britain's oldest surviving police widow
- Arthur Machen (1863–1947), author
- James May (born 1963), television presenter
- Tyler Morgan (born 1995), Welsh international rugby player
- Lyndon Mustoe (born 1969), Wales international rugby union player
- Banita Sandhu (born 1997), actress
- Carl Sargent (1952–2018)
- Caroline Sheen (born 1976), actress
- James Sommerin (born 1978), chef
- Wendy van der Plank (active 1980s), actress
- Nigel Vaughan (born 1959), Wales international footballer
- Nick Walne (born 1975), Wales international rugby union player

== In popular culture ==
- St Cadoc's Hospital in Caerleon has been featured as a location of episodes in the BBC television programmes Doctor Who, Torchwood and Being Human.
- The former campus of the University of South Wales and University of Wales Newport located in Caerleon was one of the filming sites of the Netflix series Sex Education.

== See also ==
- Caerleon Urban District
- HMS Caerleon, ship
- Pontypool, Caerleon and Newport Railway
- Usk Valley Walk

== Bibliography ==
- Hockey, Primrose (1981). Caerleon past and present. Starling Press. ISBN 9780903434430.
- Barber, Chris (1996). Arthurian Caerleon: In literature and legend. Blorenge Books. ISBN 1-872730-10-8.
- Brewer, Richard J. (2000). Caerleon and the Roman Army: The Roman Legionary Museum, a guide (2nd ed.). Cardiff, UK: National Museum Wales Books. ISBN 0-7200-0488-8. Caerleon – Isca: the Roman Legionary Museum (1st ed.). 1987.
