= Rhys Jenkins (rugby union) =

- Born: Rhys Jenkins; 15 June 1990 (age 36) Caerleon, Newport, Wales
- Height: 1.81 m (5 ft 11 in)
- Weight: 93 kg (14 st 9 lb)
- School: Caerleon Comprehensive School

Rugby union career
Senior career
Years	Team	Apps	(Points)
2010–12	Newport GD	1	(0)

Rhys Jenkins is a rugby union player for Newport RFC and the Newport Gwent Dragons regional team. He is a Wales Under 18 and Under 20 international.

A back row forward, Jenkins joined Newport RFC from Ebbw Vale RFC at the start of the 2010–11 season. He made his debut for Newport Gwent Dragons regional team against the Ospreys on 7 May 2010 as a second-half replacement. He was released by Newport Gwent Dragons at the end of the 2011–12 season and joined Newport RFC
