= Julius and Aaron =

3rd-century Romano-British Christian martyrs

Saints Julius and Aaron
- Died: c. 304 AD; Caerleon, Britain, Roman Empire
- Honoured in: Roman Catholic Church; Anglican Communion; Eastern Orthodox Church
- Feast: 1 July (trad.); 22 June (Cath.); 20 June (Cath. and Ang.)

Julius and Aaron (also Julian) were two Romano-British Christian saints who were martyred around the third century AD. Along with Saint Alban, they are the only named Christian martyrs from Roman Britain. They are name citizens of "city of the legions" by Gildas, that's to say that are from Caerleon, although their martyr might have taken place in Chester or Leicester. Their feast day was traditionally celebrated on 1 July, but it is now observed together with Alban on 20 June by the Roman Catholic and Anglican Churches.

The earliest surviving account of Julius and Aaron comes from Gildas, a monk writing in Western Britain during the sixth century. How accurate his account of events that occurred three centuries before is remains unknown; Gildas' account was later repeated by the eighth-century Anglo-Saxon monk Bede. References to Julius and Aaron were included in the work of later medieval authors like Geoffrey of Monmouth and Giraldus Cambrensis.

Gildas implied that a local cult was dedicated to Julius and Aaron was present by the sixth century, and a chapel dedicated to the saints certainly in existence near Caerleon by the ninth century, when it was recorded in a land charter. In the early twelfth century, the church passed into the property of the new Goldcliff Priory, and by 1142 had been renamed in dedication to St Alban as well as Julius and Aaron, reflecting the growing popularity of the former's cult. In later centuries, the chapel's associations with Julius and Aaron were forgotten. By the time of the sixteenth-century English Reformation, when the chapel was abandoned and perhaps converted into a barn, it was solely referred to as a Church of Saint Alban. The building fell into dilapidation and no longer survives.

== Martyrdom ==
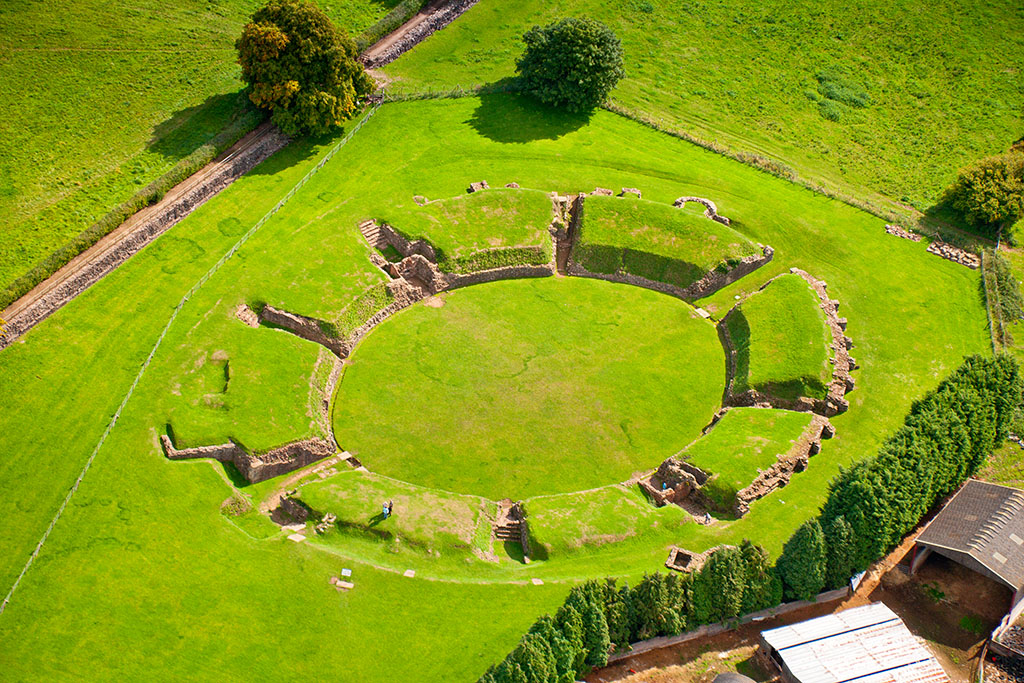
The Romano-British amphitheatre in Caerleon, the settlement where Julius and Aaron were reportedly martyred

Julius and Aaron are two of the three Christian martyrs recorded as having lived in Roman Britain, the other being St Alban. Nothing is known of them except for their martyrdom. The name "Aaron" is Hebrew and might suggest an individual of Jewish heritage. The name was exceptionally rare in both Jewish and Christian contexts at that time. The name "Julius" was extremely common among the soldiers at Caerleon, reflecting either descent from one of the Julio-Claudian Coloniae or a name taken on enlistment in the army.

=== Date of martyrdom ===
The Roman military fort at Caerleon held the Legio II Augusta, and witnessed much usage under the Roman Emperors Septimius Severus and Caracalla although saw a reduction in its occupation during the third century, when much of the legion was stationed elsewhere. The fort fell out of use between circa 287 and 296, when many of its buildings were demolished. The core of the legion were reassigned to the Richborough Fort in modern Kent. Given the abandonment of the fort at the end of the third century, it is unlikely that Julius and Aaron would have been killed as part of the anti-Christian persecutions which took place in the early fourth century.

It is more probable that they might have been executed during one of the phases of anti-Christian agitation which broke out in the empire during the mid-third century, particularly between 249 and 251 under Emperor Decius and then between 257 and 259 under Valerian. More broadly, Jeremy K. Knight noted that it probably took place at some point between Septimius Severus' prohibition on anyone converting to Christianity and Aurelian's death in 275, for his successor Constantius Chlorus did not reportedly execute Christians but restricted himself to the demolition of their churches.

=== Gildas and Bede ===
The primary evidence for Julius and Aaron comes from the writings of Gildas, who was writing somewhere in western Britain during the early to mid sixth century. There remains a question as to how the events that likely took place in third-century Caerleon were transmitted to Gildas, writing three centuries later. There is also the question as to how accurate his information about the events of the Romano-British past was; some of his claims, such as that Hadrian's Wall was built by Septimius Severus, were incorrect. Jeremy K. Knight believed that Gildas' information on Julius and Aaron should be taken seriously, for he was "a muddled, but honest, witness" to the information he received.

Gildas' De Excidio et Conquestu Britanniae is the first surviving source to mention them, and he writes that during the Diocletian persecution, "God... kindled up among us bright luminaries of holy martyrs.... Such were St. Alban of Verulam, Aaron and Julius, citizens of the city of legions and the rest, of both sexes, who in different places stood their ground in the Christian contest." Bede, drawing on Gildas, says in the Ecclesiastical History of the English People that in the same persecution during which Alban was martyred, so "suffered Aaron and Julius, citizens of Caerleon, and many others of both sexes throughout the land. After they had endured many horrible physical tortures, death brought an end to their struggles."

Bede repeats what Gildas has said but adds no additional information about the two martyrs.

=== Alternative suggested locations ===
There are loose evidence to suggest that the martyrdom may have occurred not in Caerleon, their city of origin, but in Chester. Archaeological excavations at an amphitheatre in Chester have uncovered a structure that may have been used for public executions in the Diocletian period and the possible remains of an early medieval church, which might be related to a Roman martyrdom site.

In 2016, Andrew Breeze argued that Leicester may have been the location of Aaron and Julius' martyrdom.

== Martyrium ==
Gildas' account implies that a martyrium of Julius and Aaron existed at Caerleon. Bolstering this is the fact that the twelfth-century Book of Llandaff contained a late ninth-century charter that mentions the existence of such a martyrium. This charter described a grant of land to the Bishop of Llandaff Nudd which encompassed the Territorium Sanctorum Martirum Julii et Aaron or the Merthir Iún et Aaron. Possible archaeological evidence for the existence of the early medieval martyrium comes in the form of a ninth-century sculptured cross slab which was found at Bulmore Farm, near the site of the later medieval martyrium, shortly before 1862. Stylistically part of the Gwent Group cross-slabs, most other examples come from major early churches such as St Cadoc's Church, Caerleon, St Arvans Church near Chepstow, and St Tatheus's Church in Caerwent.

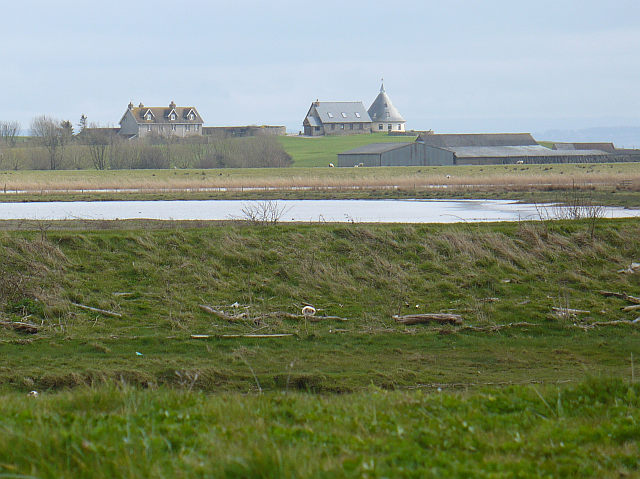
View toward the Bristol Channel at Goldcliff, with the site of Goldcliff Priory (Hill Farm house and outbuildings) in the distance

The next surviving textual reference to the martyrium dates from two centuries later. The "ecclesiam Iulii et Aron" is one of two churches mentioned in a record dating from circa 1113 recording how the local Norman landowner Robert of Chandos donated land in the area, including both churches, to the Le Bec monastery in Normandy so that they might establish a priory on it. Both the church of Saints Julius and Aaron and the Church of St Trinity again are mentioned in confirmations of the endowment of Goldcliff Priory, one produced in c.1154–58, and the other in 1204 by Hubert Walter, the Archbishop of Canterbury.

A dedication to St Alban was later added to the chapel of St Julius and St Aaron. In 1142, the monks of Goldcliff had a confirmation of their property produced which referred to the martyrium as the ecclesiam sanctorum Iulii et Aaron atque Albani. Saint Alban's popularity was growing in the twelfth century, with various ecclesiastical sites housing relics associated with him. The monks at Goldcliff may have wanted to connect their chapel to this growing cult in particular because Aaron and Julius were mentioned alongside Alban as Romano-British martyrs in the work of Gildas and Bede. Between 1113 and 1143 they likely obtained what were regarded as bones of Alban to use as relics in the chapel, thus giving substance to its renaming.

In the fifteenth century, Goldcliff Priory was passed from the ownership of Bec Abbey to Tewkesbury Abbey and then on to Eton College. Over time, the martyrium lost its associations with Julius and Aaron and came to be associated solely with Alban. This chapel of St Alban remained in existence until the English Reformation. In 1495, its three procurators leased a Caerleon tenement to a man named John Matthews. By 1624, the area, known as Mount St Albans, was the seat of the Powell family. A lease document produced in 1728 lists the associated lands, which included "Cae'r Fynwent" ("The Field of the Graveyard") and "Cae'r Scubor" (The Field of the Barn"). The barn mentioned in this document may have been the former martyrium, for several lesser churches in Monmouthshire were converted into barns at this time.

In 1798 the historian William Coxe described the site as being marked by a yew tree; he added that in 1785 "several stone coffins were discovered in digging for the foundations of a new house". The site of the martyrium is now a sloping field adjacent to houses known as Mount St Alban. In 1941, the historian Wilhelm Levison expressed his hope that archaeologists would excavate the site to learn more about the original creation of the martyrium.

== Medieval literature ==
Geoffrey of Monmouth introduced Julius and Aaron into his discussion of King Arthur's crown wearing at Caerleon. According to Geoffrey of Monmouth's account, Arthur's Caerleon contained two great churches, one a nunnery dedicated to Julius and the other a house of regular canons devoted to Aaron which contained a university. These two churches were fictitious, although in later centuries antiquarians assumed that they were real and made attempts to locate them.

Geoffrey's account influenced that of later writers like Gerald of Wales. In turn, Gerald's portrayal of Aaron and Julius influenced the account produced by the antiquarian John Leland.

== Modern ==
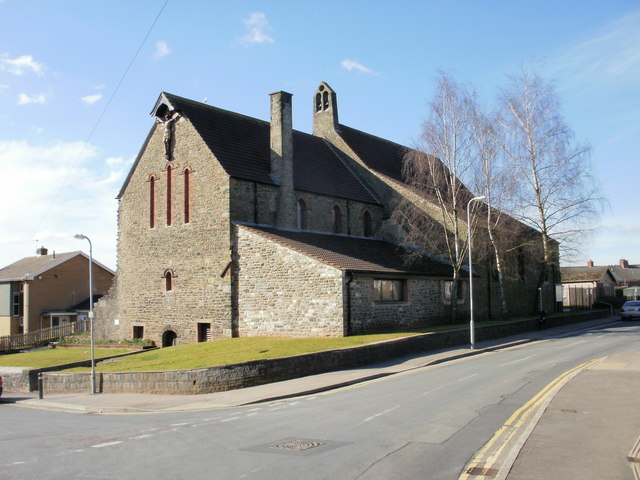
SS Julius and Aaron Church, Newport

In the sixteenth century, knowledge of Aaron and Julius was spread through the publication of printed editions of Gildas' De Excidio (1525) and Bede's Ecclesiastical History (1565). In doing so, the saints became familiar to both Roman Catholic and Protestant communities.

The 2004 edition of the Roman Martyrology recognizes the martyrs as being martyred after Alban during the persecution of Diocletian by the legionaries of Brittania Minor (Brittany), during which many 'arrived at the glorious city [of heaven] after enduring painful tortures and severe flogging'.

The Roman Martyrology indexes Aaron and Julius under 22 June, but since it is also the date when Saints John Fisher and Thomas More are celebrated, the current Roman Catholic liturgical calendar for Wales commemorates them together with St Alban, on 20 June.

=== Dedications ===
- Church of St Julius and St Aaron, Llanharan (1856–1857, Anglican)
- Church of Saints Aaron, Julius and David, Caerleon (late 19th century, Roman Catholic)
- Church of St Julius and St Aaron, St Julians, Newport (1926, Anglican).
- Church of St Julius the Martyr, Beaufort Road, Newport (20th century, Roman Catholic)
