= Tour de Gwent =

Welsh 6-route bicycle racing event

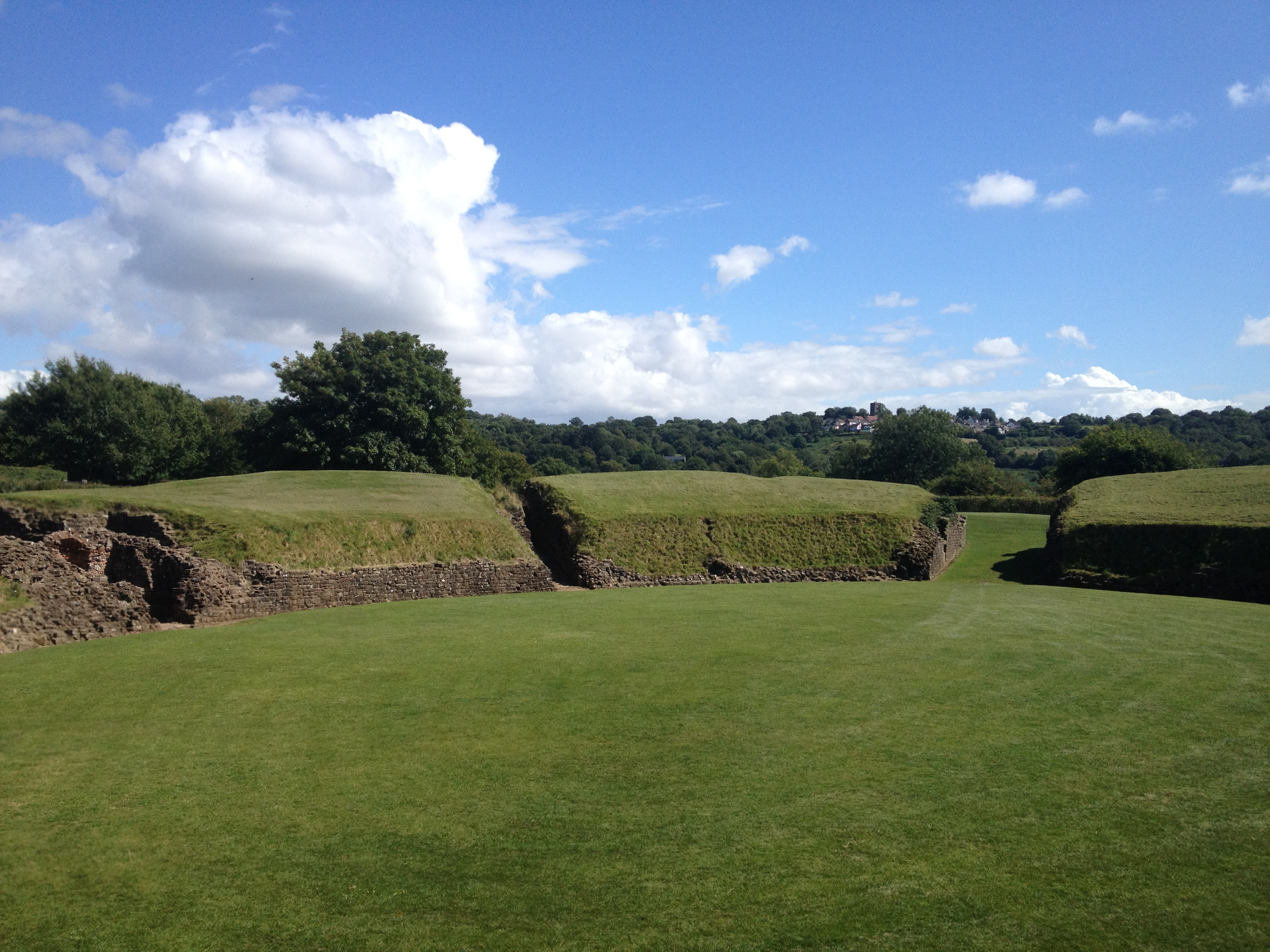
- Caerleon Roman Amphitheatre, near the Race start
- Date: March
- Location: Caerleon, Wales; Abergavenny, Wales; Wye Valley
- Event type: Road; National Cycle Route 88
- Distance: 6 route lengths: 93 miles (full length); 20 miles (shortest); 3 miles (kids)
- Primary sponsor: Whitehead
- Established: 2015
- Organizer: St Davids Hospice Care
- Website: Tour de Gwent

The Tour de Gwent (Welsh: Taith o Went) is an annual 6-route cycling event which begins in Caerleon, and follows a route through Newport and Monmouthshire . The event takes place in April each year.

The event was established in 2015, organised by the charity St Davids Hospice Care. The title sponsor is Newport construction firm Whitehead.

== Background ==
The Tour de Gwent typically takes place around 14 April. The route options include distances of 93 miles, 78 miles, 52 miles, 30 miles, 20 miles, or 3 miles. The event for 2019 is starting at and supported by Caerleon Comprehensive School.

The course is scenic, with routes of varying distance between 93 miles (full) and 3 miles (kids) to accommodate riders of various ability levels. The 93 mile route starts at the Roman fortress site of Isca Augusta, now Caerleon, which dates back to AD 74. It passes the UK's best preserved amphitheatre, the baths (thermae) at Caerleon Roman Baths Museum, and the National Roman Legion Museum.

== The Race ==
The Tour heads from Caerleon towards Llandegfedd Reservoir, the town of Usk, Abergavenny, Monmouth, the Wye Valley including Tintern, into Llantrisant, and then returning to Caerleon for the finish line. The full 93 mile route starts at 7.30am and covers 7,352 ft of climbs, including the famous climb at Lydart.

Local Newport brewery Tiny Rebel sponsor the event each year with a mobile bar and a free drink to all participants. Other businesses offer food and drinks at the finish village. Local music acts perform at a bandstand.

Riders in recent editions have come from the wider region due to the cancellation of the Velothon Wales event after its 2018 season. Larger cycling teams, including UCY Cycling Club of Ystrad Mynach, are competing in 2019.
