= Ashley Smith (rugby union) =

Welsh rugby union footballer

- Born: 13 February 1987 (age 39) Caerleon, Newport, Wales
- Height: 183 cm (6 ft 0 in)
- Weight: 93 kg (205 lb)
- School: Caerleon Comprehensive

Rugby union career
- Position: Centre
- Current team: Newport Gwent Dragons
Senior career
Years	Team	Apps	(Points)
2005–15	NG Dragons	129	(70)

Ashley Smith (born 13 February 1987 in Caerleon, Newport, Wales) is a retired Welsh rugby union player who played as a centre for Newport Gwent Dragons. Smith attended Caerleon Comprehensive School and represented Wales at Under 16, 18 and 19 level and captained the Wales under 20 team for the 2007 six nations tournament.

Smith made his debut for Newport Gwent Dragons in the 2005–06 season and was appointed captain due to injury to Luke Charteris in September 2009.

In May 2010 he was voted Newport Gwent Dragons Player of the Year in a poll of South Wales Argus readers.

Ashley Smith was forced to retire at the end of the 2014–15 season because of recurring concussions.
