= Hollybush =

- Population: 400 (approx.)
- Community: Malpas
- Principal area: Newport
- Country: Wales
- Sovereign state: United Kingdom
- Post town: NEWPORT
- Postcode district: NP20 6
- Dialling code: 01633
- Police: Gwent
- Fire: South Wales
- Ambulance: Welsh
- UK Parliament: Newport West

Hollybush is a residential area of Malpas within the city of Newport, South Wales, United Kingdom.

== Location ==
Hollybush is situated off Malpas Road in Newport and the Monmouthshire and Brecon Canal that runs through it.

== Amenities and history ==
The neighbourhood contains The Harvester, The Spar, Kok's Wok Chinese Takeaway and Mint and Mango Indian Takeaway. The area is also home to around 400 inhabitants who are closely situated to Malpas Road, one of the busiest roads in Newport.

The area consists of the streets of Hollybush Avenue, Hollybush Close, Coolgreany Crescent, Coolgreany Close, and Westfield Way.

== Government ==
The area is governed by the Newport City Council.
