= Caerleon Endowed School =

The Endowed School
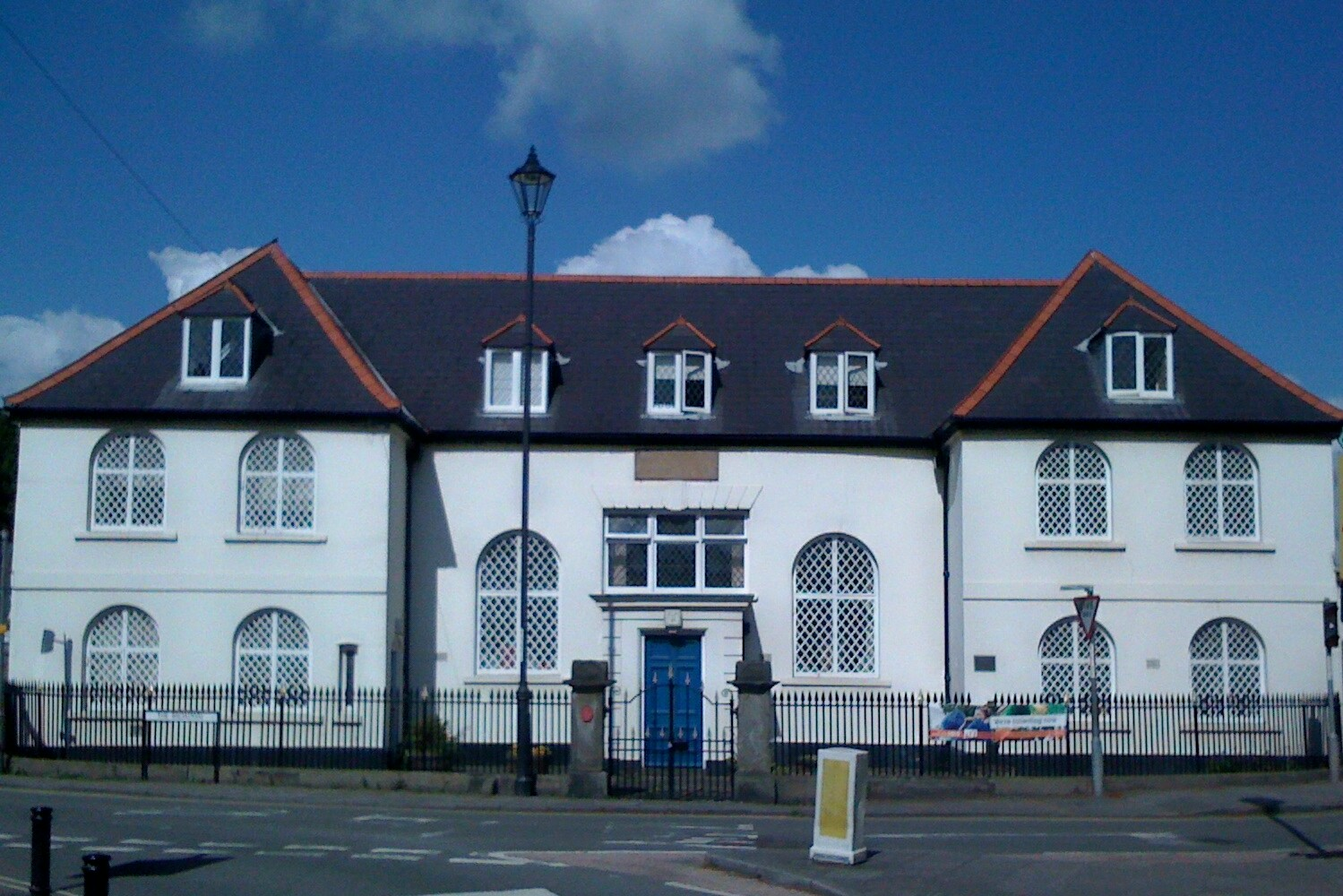
- Front view of school

- Location in Newport
- 51.61018°N 2.956173°W
- Type: School
- Location: Caerleon, Newport, Wales
- OS grid reference: ST 33885 90583

History
- Built: 1724

Listed Building – Grade II*
- Official name: The Endowed School
- Designated: 11 July 1951
- Reference no.: 2984
- Community: Caerleon

Caerleon Endowed School, (also known as The Endowed School, Caerleon, Caerleon Charity School, Williams Charity School and Caerleon Junior School), in Caerleon, Newport, dates from 1724. At that point, the house was a junior school that was funded by a bequest from Charles Williams. The school became part of the state education system in 1948 under the Education Act 1944. The school was designated a Grade II* listed building in 1951.

The bequest was for "30 boys and 20 girls of the poorer sort", but the trustees reduced this to 20 boys and 10 girls. From 1724 to 1948 the school had only nine headmasters. The left and right wings of the buildings included houses for the school master and school mistress respectively.

John Newman, in his Gwent/Monmouthshire volume of the Pevsner Buildings of Wales series, describes the school as "educational bounty on an exceptional scale for the 18th century". The layout (a half H) become a model for later schools in Wales.

== Sources ==
- Newman, John (2000). Gwent/Monmouthshire. Pevsner Architectural Guides (The Buildings of Wales). London: Penguin Books. ISBN 0-14-071053-1. OCLC 45327986.
