= Malpas, Newport =

Malpas

- Location within Newport
- Population: 7,997 (2011)
- OS grid reference: ST305908
- Principal area: Newport
- Country: Wales
- Sovereign state: United Kingdom
- Post town: NEWPORT
- Postcode district: NP20 6
- Dialling code: 01633; Chartist exchange
- Police: Gwent
- Fire: South Wales
- Ambulance: Welsh
- UK Parliament: Newport East
- Senedd Cymru – Welsh Parliament: Newport West
- List of places UK Wales Newport 51°36′51″N 3°00′22″W Map of the community

Malpas is an electoral district (ward) and coterminous community (parish) of the city of Newport, South Wales. The area is governed by the Newport City Council.

== Boundaries ==
The ward is bounded by the A4042 Heidenheim Drive to the east, the city boundary to the north, Malpas brook to the west, and Bettws Lane, Llanover Close, and the western and northern edges of Graig Wood, Yewberry Lane and Grove Park Drive to the south.

== Name origin ==
The name is French and comes from Mal (bad/poor) and Pas (passage/way). Earlier examples of the name include the definite article 'Le' and even an odd Welsh definite article 'Y' i.e. Le Malpas, Y Malpas.

== The community ==
There are two large housing estates either side of the main Malpas Road (A4051). To the west is Hollybush and the council estates of Westfield and Malpas Court, although many of the houses are now in private ownership. To the east are the privately owned estates Woodlands, Malpas Park, Pilton Vale and Claremont. The roads in Malpas Court take their names from famous inventors and scientists, while those in Malpas Park are named after trees. The roads in Woodlands are named after World War II generals, e.g. Allenbrooke Avenue, Horrocks Close, Montgomery Road, Robertson Way, Wavell Drive, etc. Claremont and Pilton Vale however are just single street names with large house numbers.

The Malpas Institute Trust is a charitable fund, founded on the sale of the World War I Memorial Institute.

There are four primary schools in the ward: Malpas Church in Wales Primary, Malpas Court, and Malpas Park.

There are three Christian churches in Malpas, St. Mary's Church in Wales, Trinity Presbyterian, and St. Anne's Roman Catholic. The fourth Malpas Church, Christchurch, which is just off the Old Malpas Road is in the Shaftesbury Ward. There are no formal places of worship for other religions or faiths.

Malpas is also home to St Joseph's Hospital, Newport, one of Wales's largest private hospitals, and an in-patient hospice service, St Anne's Hospice, both originally run by the Sisters of St. Joseph of Annecy. Since 2013 the hospice has been run by St David's Foundation Hospice Care, whilst the hospital was taken over by a consortium of businessmen and doctors in July 2014.

There is a detachment for Gwent & Powys Army Cadet Force near Oliphant Circle.

A station of South Wales Fire and Rescue Service is located in Malpas.

== Cycling and walking ==
A cycle and pedestrian walkway alongside the River Usk links Malpas to Caerleon and Newport city centre at Crindau.
