= Newport Half Marathon =

Annual half marathon race in the city of Newport, Wales

- Admiral City of Newport Wales Half Marathon Logo
- Date: March
- Location: Newport, Wales
- Event type: Road
- Distance: Half Marathon
- Primary sponsor: Admiral Insurance
- Established: 2013
- Course records: Men: (Wales) Chris Carpanini; 01:08:18 (2019); Women: (Wales) Emma Wookey; 1:16:46 (2015)
- Website: City of Newport Half Marathon

Newport Half Marathon
- City of Newport and (inset) within Wales

The Admiral City of Newport Half Marathon is an annual half marathon race held in the Welsh city of Newport, Wales, taking place in March. The event was established in 2013, organised by the charity St. Davids Hospice Care.

== Background ==
The title sponsor is locally based Admiral Insurance, and the race has grown to accommodate up to almost 2,000 runners. Additional sponsors include Skechers, the South Wales Argus, the University of South Wales, Newport City Council and the city's sports authority Newport Live.

The course is scenic, first travelling into Pillgwenlly and past the Grade I listed Transporter Bridge, then routing along the Newport city riverfront, Usk river pathways, and onto the historic Route 88 Caerleon to Cardiff Sustrans cycle path, as well as sometimes heading over iconic bridges in the city.

Each year the route passes the historic Roman remains of the fortress town Caerleon (Isca Augusta), which dates back to 74 AD. The route includes a section past the UK's best preserved amphitheatre, the thermae at Caerleon Roman Baths Museum and the National Roman Legion Museum, before following Caerleon Road back into the city centre for the finishline.

It is held in March of each year, with the exception of 2018. Its sister event is the ABP Newport Marathon, which was inaugurated in 2018.

== Event history ==
=== 2019 results ===
1,931 runners competed in the 2019 race, which took place on 3 March 2019, the first held since 2017. The event also included a 2 km fun run and other family events on 2 March, at Friars Walk, Newport.

The race consisted of wet conditions but mild temperatures. Competitors included local AM for Newport East John Griffiths and TV personality CJ de Mooi.

The male winner was the course record holder Chris Carpanini, winning for the second time with a time of 01:08:18. Sioned Howells of Amman Valley Harriers was the fastest female with a time of 01:22:59.

=== 2018 cancellation ===
In 2018, the Newport Half Marathon was beset by unseasonably snowy weather, with two attempted dates on Sunday, 4 March and then again on Sunday, 17 March both cancelled.

Organisers St. Davids Hospice Care's fundraising efforts were hit severely. The organisation reorganised for 2019 and asked participants to defer their entry for the following year.

=== 2017 results ===
1,878 runners finished the race in 2017, with Micky Morris Racing Team's Chris Carpanini placing first, setting an event record time of 1:09:54, and Natasha Cockram of Cwmbran Pub Runners first among the women with a time of 1:21:13.

=== 2016 results ===
1,555 runners competed in the 2016 race with Swansea Harriers' Phillip Matthews winning with a time of 1:13:40, and Totton Running Club's Helen Wallington placing highest among the women, with a time of 1:24:30.

=== 2015 results ===
1,845 runners competed in the 2015 race with Harry Jones (unaffiliated) winning with a time of 1:11:57, and Emma Wookey of Lliswerry Runners setting the current event record women's time at 1:16:46.

=== 2014 results ===
Of 1,003 runners, Ryan McFlynn of Fairwater Runners Cwmbran again won with a faster time of 1:14:46, and Emma Wookey was the fastest female with a time of 1:22:36.

=== 2013 results ===
Of 1,062 runners, Ryan McFlynn of Fairwater Runners Cwmbran placed first with a time of 1:17:23 and Annabel Granger was the fastest woman with a time of 1:21:45.
