= Crindau =

Coordinates: 51°35′58″N 2°59′42″W

Crindau: Welsh: Crindai
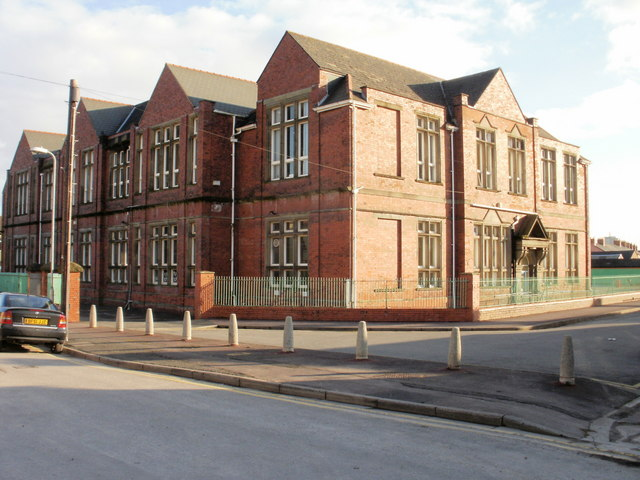
- Crindau Primary School, built 1901
- Population: 5,000 approx.
- OS grid reference: ST295885
- Principal area: Newport
- Country: Wales
- Sovereign state: United Kingdom
- Post town: NEWPORT
- Postcode district: NP20 5
- Dialling code: 01633; Savoy exchange
- Police: Gwent
- Fire: South Wales
- Ambulance: Welsh
- UK Parliament: Newport West

Crindau (Welsh: Crindai) is a Victorian inner-city area just north of the city centre in Newport in south-east Wales. It lies within the Shaftesbury electoral district (ward) and community (parish).

Crindau is roughly bounded by the Monmouthshire canal to the west, the M4 motorway to the north, River Usk to the east and South Wales Main Line to the south. It is bisected by the elevated section of the A4042 road. The district is well-served in transport terms as it contains junction 26 and 25a of the M4 as well as the A4042 and A4051 roads. There is a regular Newport Bus service from Malpas and Bettws to the city centre.

To the eastern side, adjoining the river is Shaftesbury Park, opened in 1898, which was the original home of Newport Rugby Club before they moved to the Newport Athletics and Cricket Club site at Rodney Parade.

A cycle and pedestrian walkway alongside the River Usk links Newport city centre to the centre of Caerleon along National Cycle Route 88. There is a marked heritage trail in Caerleon.

Crindau is well served by a number of churches providing a cross-section of Christian traditions including Malpas Road Evangelical Church (built 1897), Crindau Community Church (built 1901), and All Saints Church (built 1898, rebuilt 1995).

== History ==
Until 1875 the area was marshland with the northern artery road of Newport running through it. The only residences were Crindau House, an Elizabethan Manor, and a row of terraces built by the Great Western Railway in the 1850s to house its workers. After the extension of the borough by the Newport (Monmouthshire) Improvement Act 1876 and the new Marshes Road entrance from Old Green opened, Newport Corporation began construction of the Marshes estate, streets named after Newport mayors and was completed in 1901, the remainder of the land becoming Shaftesbury Park. More land was acquired to the north of Crindau Pill, along the eastern side of the railway, and a gas and glass works were opened in 1886. The same year the Newport Workmens Cottage Company was established and built terraced houses for the poor at cheaper rates, (Albany, Agincourt (formerly Arlington), Ailesbury, Argyle, Adelaide, Aragon and Alderney) in between the works and the Marshes up until its dissolution in 1899. Development followed from the 1890s on the western side of the railway, on what has now become Malpas Road. A confectionery works, Lovell's, was established in 1893 on Albany Street and in 1918 its football team was founded with its own ground on the works site, Rexville. Along Albany Street in the early 20th century were also a brick works, pottery and steam laundry.

Post-war redevelopments such as the M4 motorway in the 1960s and older housing clearances in the 1970s changed the landscape of Crindau. The Malpas Road Relief Scheme in the 1990s follows the route of the railway. Closed industries such as the glass, gas, pottery and confectionery works were redeveloped and a new flood defence scheme was completed in 2021 (the area having been notoriously subjected to flooding for hundreds of years). Only the Lyceum Tavern (est. 1898) and the Crindau Constitutional Club (est. 1902) on Malpas Road remain as the original licensed premises. All other public houses and social clubs in the area have been demolished or converted to other means.
