= Ashton Hewitt =

- Born: Ashton Hewitt; 20 November 1994 (age 31) Newport, Wales
- Height: 180 cm (5 ft 11 in)
- Weight: 90 kg (14 st 2 lb)
- School: Caerleon Comprehensive School
- University: University of South Wales

Rugby union career
- Position: Wing
- Current team: Dragons
Senior career
Years	Team	Apps	(Points)
2013–	Dragons	125	(180)
- Correct as of 11:44, 6 February 2024 (UTC)
International career
Years	Team	Apps	(Points)
2013–2014	Wales U20	4	(0)
- Correct as of 11 March 2023

Ashton Hewitt (born 20 November 1994) is a Welsh rugby union player who plays as a wing for the Dragons regional team, having previously played for Cross Keys RFC and Newport RFC. He is a Wales under-20 international. Hewitt made his Dragons debut in an LV Cup match against the Scarlets on 8 November 2013.

Hewitt is executive chairman of the Welsh Rugby Players Association. He is outspoken against racism, supporting racial justice and also advocates for Welsh independence.

== International ==
He was named in the Wales squad for the uncapped international versus the Barbarians on 30 November 2019.

== Personal life ==
Hewitt was born and raised in Newport to a British-Jamaican father and a white mother, and started playing rugby at Pill Harriers RFC. As well as pursuing a career in professional sport, he holds a degree in Criminology, Criminal Justice and Youth Justice from the University of South Wales.

Following the mass support of the Black Lives Matter movement in the US and Britain, he has openly supported racial justice and has spoken out about racist abuse he has received. He has also called the rugby authorities to have a stronger stance against racial discrimination, particularly after Argentina's captain Pablo Matera was suspended due to racist tweets.

Hewitt supports Welsh independence and has said that "there's more reasons to be yes than no".
