= Caerleon Comprehensive School =

- Ysgol Gyfun Caerllion

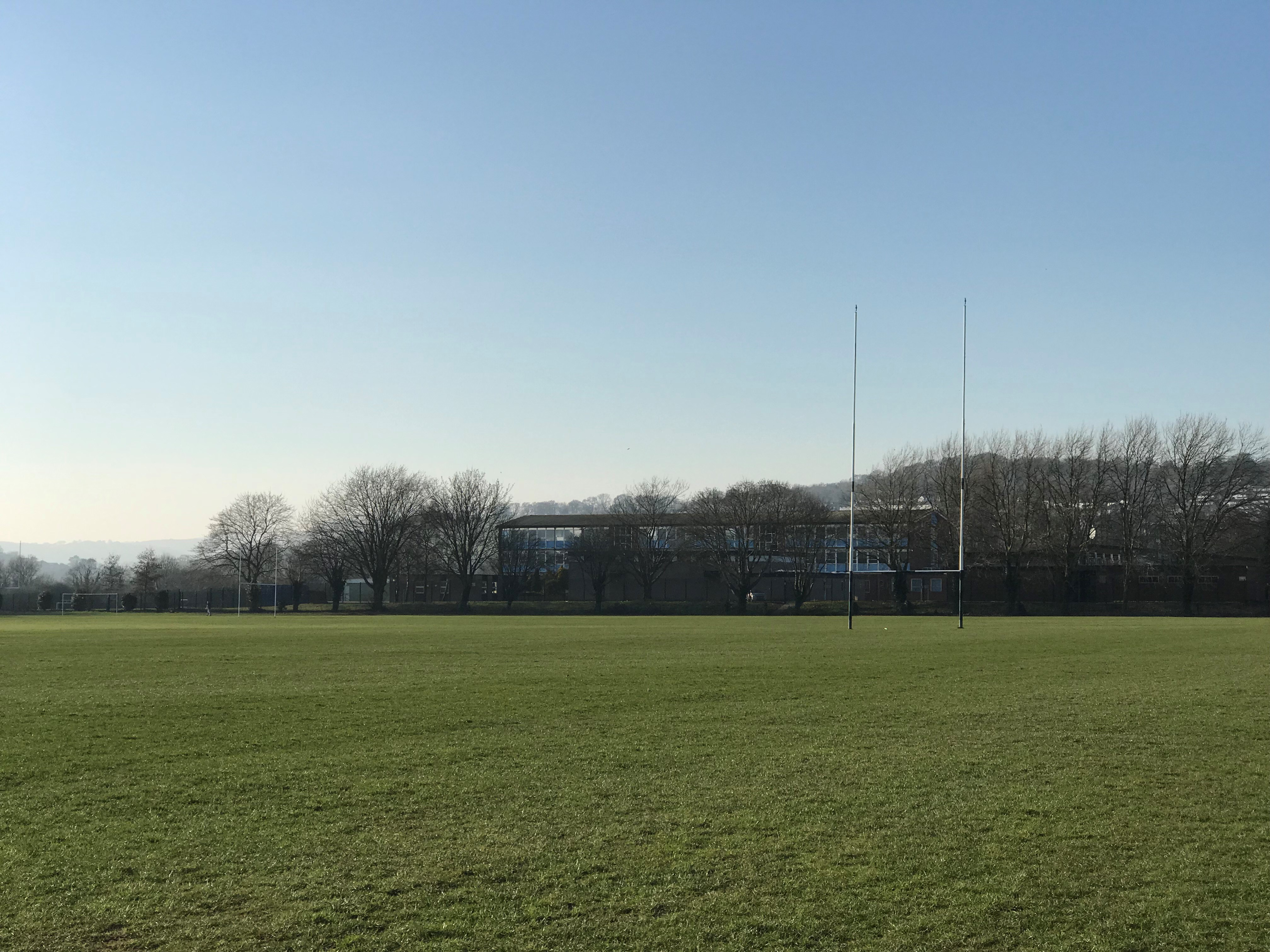
- Caerleon Comprehensive School behind the Cricket Pavilion

Location
- Cold Bath Road; Caerleon, Newport, NP18 1NF; Wales; 51.6101°N 2.9618°W

Information
- Type: Community school
- Motto: Welsh: sicrhewch ragoriaeth (maximising potential)
- Local authority: Newport City Council
- Department for Education URN: 401870 Tables
- Head teacher: Lucy Purcell
- Teaching staff: 78.5 (on an FTE basis)
- Gender: Mixed
- Age range: 11–18
- Enrolment: 1,484 (2018)
- Capacity: 1,489
- Student to teacher ratio: 18.9
- Language: English
- Website: www.caerleoncomprehensive.net

Caerleon Comprehensive School (Welsh: Ysgol Gyfun Caerllion) is an 11–18 mixed, English-medium community Secondary School and Sixth Form in Caerleon, Newport, Wales.

The school was ranked 6th in the WalesOnline Best Secondary Schools in Wales 2018 awards, and was given the title of best school in the area.

== Location ==
The school's catchment area covers primary schools in Caerleon and Ponthir, along with Langstone Primary School, Usk Junior School and some students from central Newport schools. The catchment boundaries extend to Caerleon, Ponthir, Llanfrechfa, Llantrisant, Penhow, and Llanmartin.

Parental concerns in Monmouthshire were raised in 2019 as Monmouthshire County Council brought new boundaries into effect, meaning Usk Primary School students are to move to Monmouth Comprehensive School from September 2020, having historically attended Caerleon since 1996.

== Academic performance ==
There are 1,484 pupils on roll, of whom 350 are A-Level students in the sixth form.

The school was ranked by WalesOnline as 6th in Wales and 1st in the nearby area. According to a 2016 Estyn inspection, all students leaving at Key Stage 4 left with a recognised qualification.

In 2019, ICT teacher Phil Meredith was highlighted at the Professional Teaching Awards Cymru, and a pupil won an award at the GlaxoSmithKline Big Bang UK Young Scientists and Engineers Fair in Birmingham.

Wales Real Schools Guide 2018
| Criterea | Ranking |
|---|---|
| Wales ranking | 6th (of 210) |
| Local ranking | 1st (of 10) |
| Percentage score | 74.14% |
| Attainment | 5☆ |
| Progress | 5☆ |
| Attendance | 5☆ |
| Finances | 1☆ |

Examination results (versus national average)
| Examination type | School percentage | National average | Difference |
|---|---|---|---|
GCSE
| GCSE A* to C grades | 81.3% | 54.6% | +26.7% |
| GCSE A* to A grades | 32.9% | 18.5% | +14.4 |
A Level
| A Level A* to C grades | 86.4% | 76.3% | +10.1 |
| A Level A* to A grades | 36.1% | 26.3% | +9.8% |

Performance in protected categories
| Measure | School percentage | National average | Difference |
|---|---|---|---|
| Attendance | 95.3% | 94.1% | +1.2% |
| Free School Meals | 5.6% | 17% | −11.4% |
| BME pupils | 15.9% | 9.3% | −6.6% |
| Statemented pupils | 1.9% | 2.3% | −0.4% |

=== Modern Foreign Languages ===
Caerleon has in recent years been covered by local media as it is now the only Newport state school offering German as a subject choice to students, amid cuts elsewhere to language education among UK schools. Its language teachers founded the South Wales-wide teachers network for language education in the region. The school also offers Welsh and French to Advanced Level study.

=== Sports ===
The school has traditionally produced a number of sporting names across a range of disciplines. The school has multiple rugby union, football, and netball sides, as well as offering tennis courts and basketball facilities for physical education lessons. The school is also near to the Celtic Manor operated Caerleon Golf Course and the full-size cricket, football, and rugby facilities on the neighbouring Caerleon Pavilion.

Names linked to Caerleon who have been successful in sporting endeavours include Dragons player and Ireland Under-20 Grand Slam winner James McCarthy, Dragons and Wales international Tyler Morgan, and Wales Wales U20 capped Ashton Hewitt.

Historic sportspeople who have attended the school include Wales, Chelsea F.C. and Swansea City goalkeeper Roger Freestone, Cardiff City F.C. and Wales midfielder Nigel Vaughan, Wales rugby winger Nick Walne, and prop Lyndon Mustoe. Others include Gary Hocking, a Grand Prix racing champion, as well as footballer and cricketer Len Hill.

=== Finances ===
In June 2019, local press reported that issues had arisen at the school, with a £500,000 loan from Newport City Council due to be paid, and debts totalling £1.6m forecast for the next 18 months. Appointed auditors stated that financial practices at the school were "not well controlled" requiring urgent changes. However school reserves in 2016/17 were reported to finally be positive, having been in negative balance from 2012 to 2014.

The school is set to receive investment from the £70m Welsh Government 21st Century School programme. Further investment in the school was promised by the University of South Wales upon the sale and redevelopment of the former University of Wales, Newport campus in Caerleon. The Redrow redevelopment plans for housing on the site were rejected in 2019 but subsequently approved in 2021.

== Notable former pupils ==
- Nigel Vaughan – Wales international footballer
- Nick Walne – Wales international rugby union player
- Ashley Smith, Rhys Jenkins, Tyler Morgan and Ashton Hewitt – Dragons rugby union players
- Steve Lowndes – Wales international footballer, former teacher
- Rachel Rice – 2008 Big Brother winner
- Darragh Mortell – actor
- Tyler Morgan – Wales international rugby union player
- Caroline Sheen – actor
- Dom Jefferies – footballer
