= St Cadoc's Church, Caerleon =

Church in Caerleon, Newport, Wales

Coordinates: 51.6107°N 2.9554°W

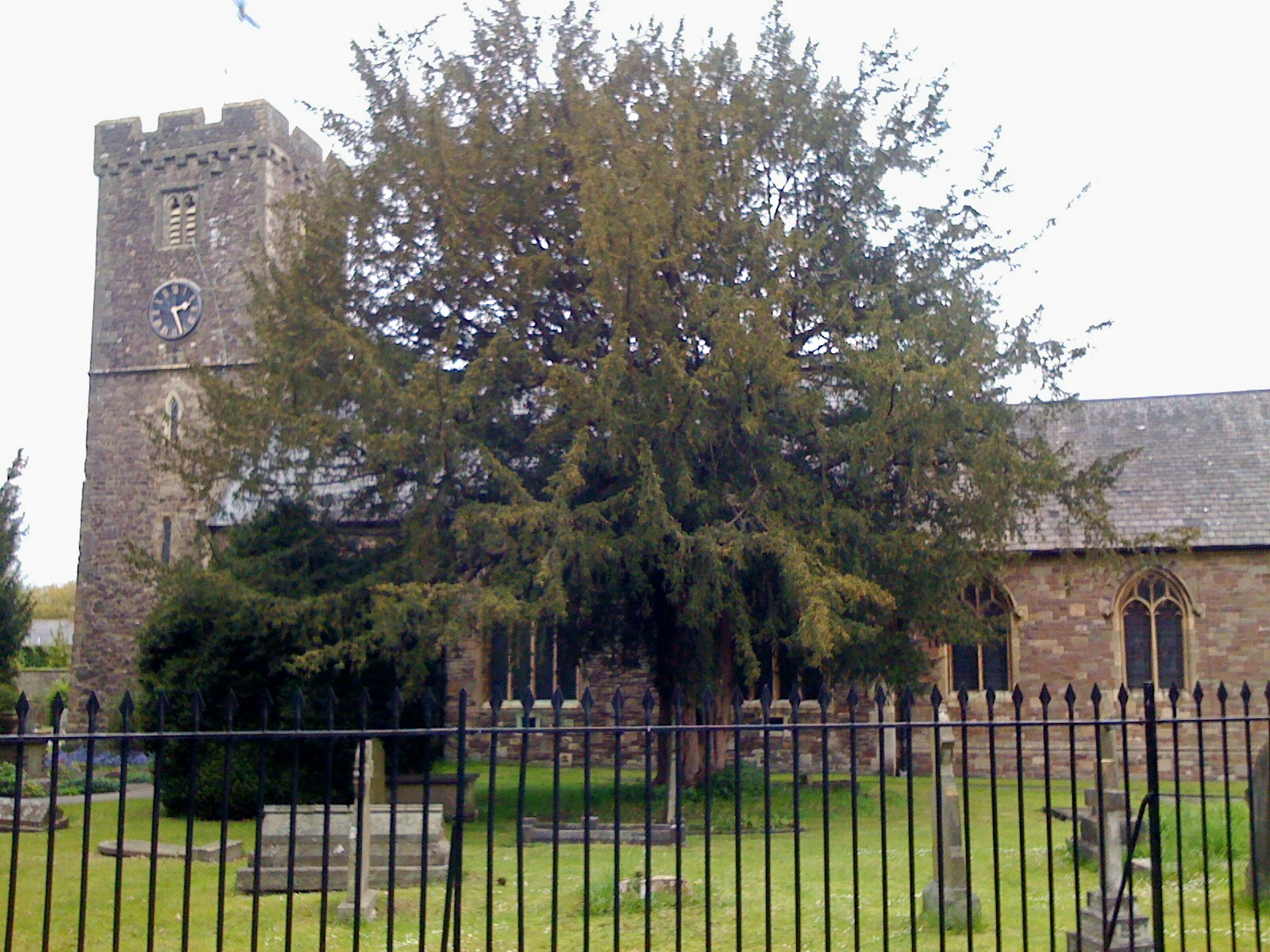
St Cadoc's Church, Church in Wales, Caerleon

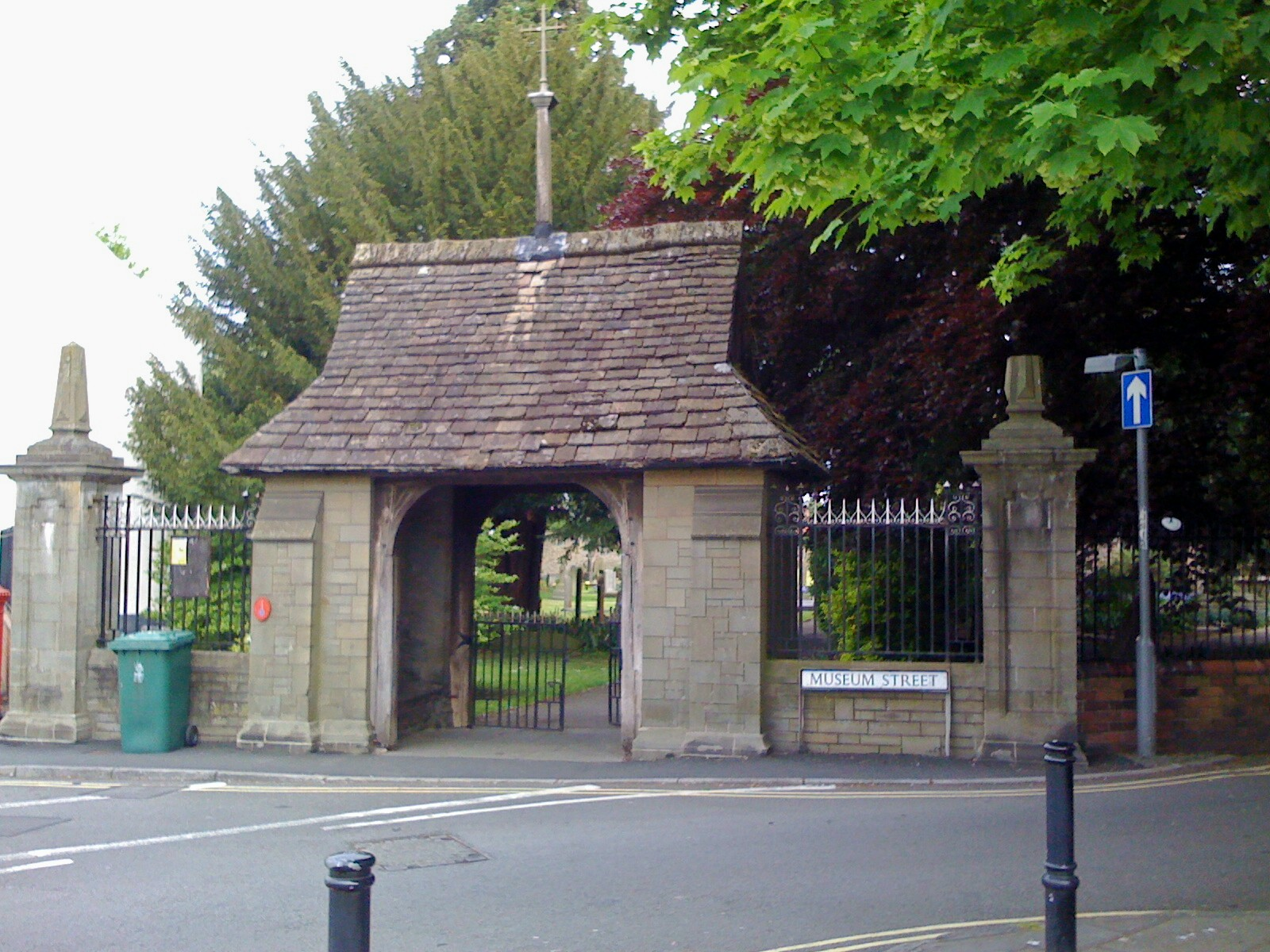
The lychgate

St Cadoc's Church is a Church in Wales church located in Caerleon, Newport, Wales and is Grade II* listed. It is one of many buildings associated with the travels of St Cadoc.

Caerleon is the historically important site of the Roman legionary fortress of Isca Augusta. St Cadoc's Church stands over the principia (headquarters), where the legionary standards were kept and statues of the Roman emperors venerated. The earliest surviving part of the church dates back to just after the kingdom of Glywysing was overrun by the Normans during the twelfth century and is thought to be the work of Hywel ap Iowerth, who was also the founder of the Cistercian Llantarnam Abbey.

The current church is in the Perpendicular style, which was fashionable in the fifteenth century. The tower, which stands at the southwest corner of the church, has a lower stage that was probably part of the original Norman church, incorporating twelfth/thirteenth century lancet windows. The church features a series of impressive stained-glass windows depicting the life of Christ and symbolising the faith and devotion of the saints associated with Caerleon.

St Cadoc's Church has been designated as Grade II* listed since 1951, as a centrepiece of the village with a fine medieval tower.

== See also ==
- Cambuslang
- Llancarfan, site of Cadoc's 6th century abbey
- St Cadoc's Hospital, Caerleon
- St Cadocs/Penygarn, electoral ward, in Torfaen, also with a St Cadoc's church
- St Cadoc's Church, Raglan
- St Cadoc's Church, Llangattock Lingoed
