= Nick Walne =

Wales international rugby union footballer

- Born: Nicholas John Walne; 18 September 1975 (age 51) Scunthorpe, Lincolnshire, England
- Height: 193 cm (6 ft 4 in)
- Weight: 95 kg (14 st 13 lb)
- School: Caerleon Comprehensive School
- University: Cambridge University

Rugby union career
- Position(s): Wing, Centre
Senior career
Years	Team	Apps	(Points)
1996	Cardiff	1	(5)
1998-1999	Richmond	28	(15)
1999-2003	Cardiff	82	(170)
2003-2005	Cardiff Blues	28	(35)
International career
Years	Team	Apps	(Points)
1999	Wales	3	(5)

Nicholas John Walne (born 18 September 1975) is a former Wales international rugby union player. He was selected for the 1999 Rugby World Cup squad. Walne usually played on the wing but sometimes at centre. He played his club rugby for Cardiff. Walne was raised in the Monmouthshire village of Llangybi and educated at Caerleon Comprehensive School.
