= National Cycle Route 88 =

Cycle route in the United Kingdom

Coordinates: 51.586630°N 2.991209°W

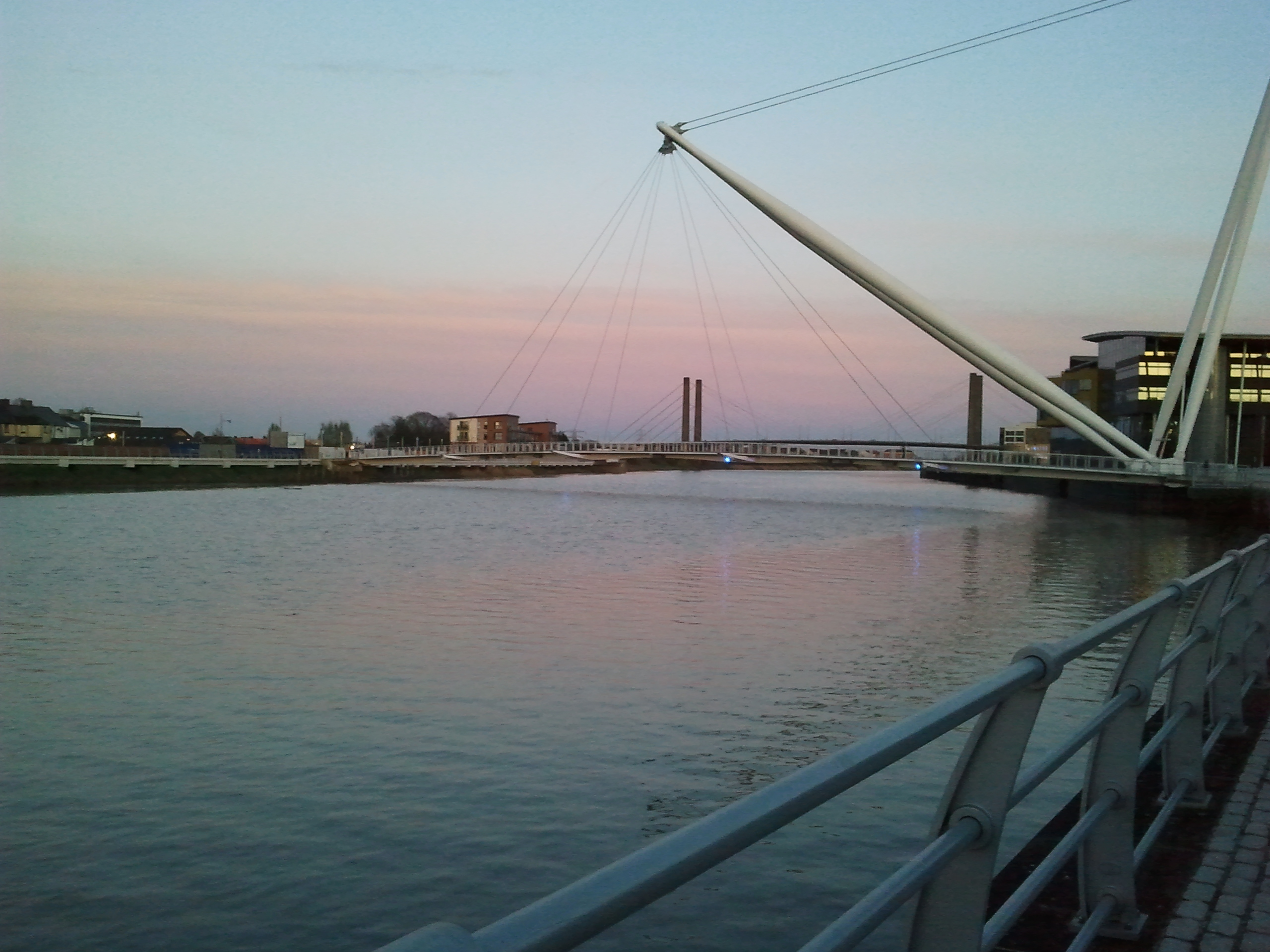
- NCR 88 following the River Usk through Newport
- Length: 6 miles (Newport to Caerleon); 6.2 miles (Cardiff Bay)
- Location: Cardiff Newport, Wales Caerleon
- Established: 2011
- Designation: NCR 88
- Use: Cycling Pedestrian
- Difficulty: Easy
- Surface: Concrete/tarmac
- Right of way: Merges with roadways at points
- Certification: Sustrans
- Website: https://www.sustrans.org.uk/ncn/map/route/route-88

Trail map
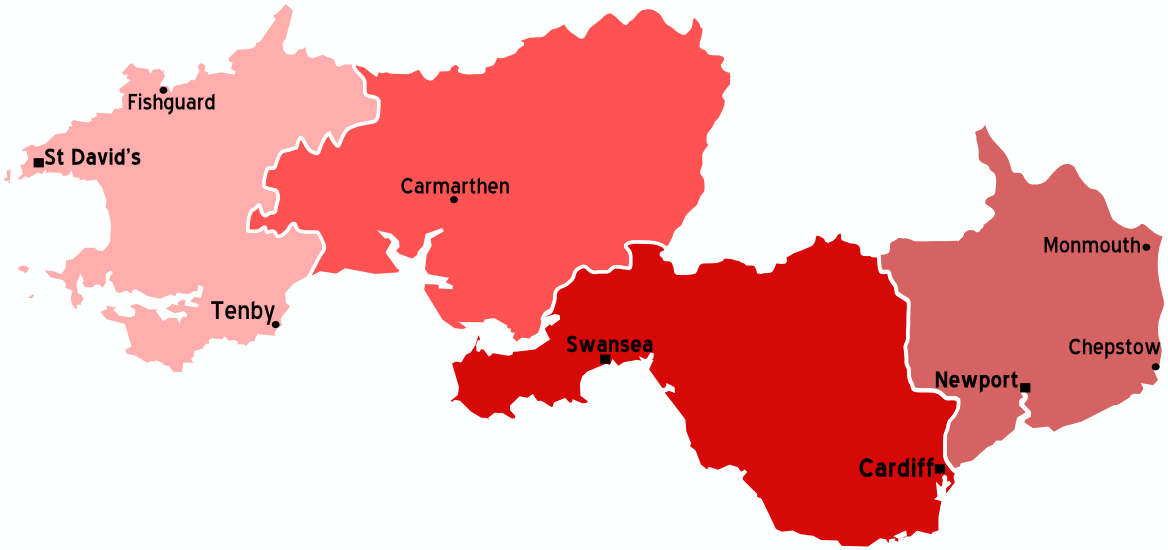
- Map of South Wales with Newport and Cardiff (east) containing NCR 88

National Cycle Route 88 (or NCR 88) is a route of the United Kingdom National Cycle Network, running from Newport to its planned finish site at Margam.

The full route planned will pass along the coast of South Wales, largely east–west from Newport to Cardiff and on to Margam via Bridgend, and in total may go on to stretch for 78 km (48 mi) in length. The route is so far formed by a mixture of some new paths, such as a boardwalk made of recycled material around Caerleon, stone paths through Newport city centre, and in other places public highways. On some linked paths such as canal paths, a hybrid or 'hard tail' mountain bike fitted with wide road tires would be most suitable.

Newport city centre and Cardiff are both easily reached on the rail network. Typically South Wales is more accessible through the canal paths heading up north into the valleys than east to west.

== Route ==
=== Caerleon to Newport ===
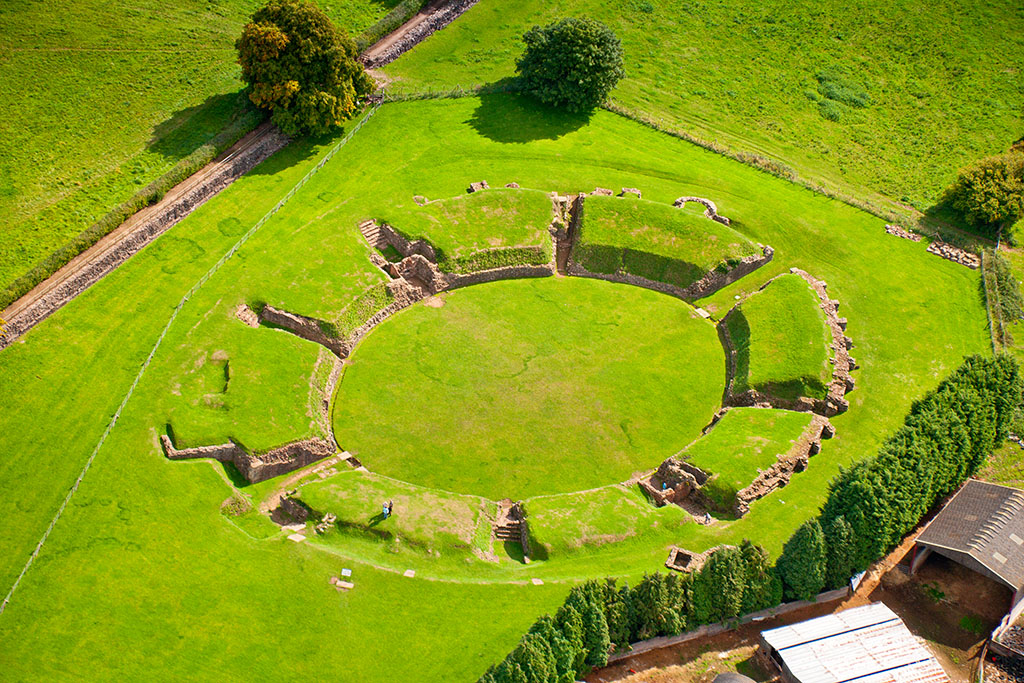
Aerial view of Caerleon Roman amphitheatre

This completed seven mile riverside path is a mixture of existing stone path and new hybrid materials running from the town centre of historic Caerleon and its former Roman Settlement site through to Newport city centre along the riverfront of the Usk. It is also within reach of the Celtic Manor Resort.

=== Newport to Cardiff ===
The first completed section is formed of the now completed Marshfield to the Duffryn path, completed in 2015.

The second section is the planned Marshfield to the Newport Road retail area and Cardiff City centre route being developed by Cardiff Council on the Cardiff Enfys network. A second Cycle Superhighway running on Newport Road and Cypress Drive is also being developed.

=== Cardiff to Penarth ===
The completed Cardiff section is largely based on the Cardiff Bay Trail with a bridge across the River Ely between Penarth and the Cardiff International Sports Village at Cardiff Bay. This connects the Sports Village to Cogan railway station, enabling commuting and linking to Penarth town centre.
