= Grade I listed buildings in Monmouthshire =

Monmouthshire shown within Wales

Monmouthshire is a county of Wales. It borders Torfaen and Newport to the west; Herefordshire and Gloucestershire to the east; and Powys to the north. The largest town is Abergavenny, with the other major towns being Chepstow, Monmouth, and Usk. The county is 850 km^{2} (330 sq mi) in extent, with a population of 95,200 as of 2020. The present county was formed under the Local Government (Wales) Act 1994, which came into effect in 1996, and comprises some sixty percent of the historic county. Between 1974 and 1996, the county was known by the ancient title of Gwent, recalling the medieval Welsh kingdom. In his essay on local government in the fifth and final volume of the Gwent County History, Robert McCloy suggests that the governance of "no county in the United Kingdom in the twentieth century was so transformed as that of Monmouthshire".

In the United Kingdom, the term "listed building" refers to a building or other structure officially designated as being of special architectural, historical or cultural significance. Listing was begun by a provision in the Town and Country Planning Act 1947. Once a building is listed, strict limitations are imposed on the modifications allowed to its structure or fittings. In Wales, authority for listing under the Planning (Listed Buildings and Conservation Areas) Act 1990 lies with Cadw. Listed buildings are categorised into three grades:

- Grade I – buildings of exceptional interest, only 2.5% of listed buildings in England and Wales are Grade I;
- Grade II* – buildings of particular importance with more than special interest, 5.8% of listed buildings in England and Wales are Grade II*;
- Grade II – buildings of special interest; 91.7% of all listed buildings in England and Wales are in this class.

There are 53 Grade I listed buildings in Monmouthshire. (Note: The British Listed Buildings online (BLBO) site records 54 listed buildings, as it has two entries for the Old Wye Bridge, Chepstow. It is not uncommon for bridges to have two listings when, as at Chepstow, one end of the bridge is in one country and the other in another. BLBO records the listing for the English end of the bridge (Entry 8, HE 1101561) as 'Chepstow Bridge', and the listing for the Welsh end (Entry 47, Cadw 2479) as 'Road Bridge over River Wye'.) These consist of twenty-four churches, a priory and an abbey, eight castles, seven houses, two bridges, a barn, a cross, a farm, a folly, a gatehouse, a hotel, a municipal building, a stables, and two elements of town walls. The journalist Simon Jenkins notes the county's "fine collection" of castles, mostly dating from the Norman invasion of Wales, and describes Chepstow as "the glory of medieval south Wales". The castle at Raglan is later, dating from the mid-fifteenth century. The fortified bridge over the River Monnow at Monmouth is the only remaining fortified river bridge in the country with its gate tower standing on the bridge, and has been described as "arguably the finest surviving medieval bridge in Britain". Monmouthshire has a more "modest" range of churches, although that at Bettws Newydd has "perhaps the most complete rood arrangement remaining in any church in England and Wales". The county's Grade I listed abbey, at Tintern, became a focal point of the Wye Tour in the late-eighteenth century. The Monmouthshire writer and artist, Fred Hando, chronicled the history of the county in some 800 newspaper articles written between the 1920s and the 1960s and published in the South Wales Argus, focusing on "the little places of a shy county". Among the Grade I listed structures Hando described were "the tallest house in Monmouthshire" at Treowen, "the most crooked church in Britain" at Cwmyoy, and the Arts and Crafts sgraffito at Llanfair Kilgeddin.

Notable people associated with Monmouthshire's Grade I listed buildings include Henry V, born at Monmouth Castle in 1387; the medieval soldier and statesman William Marshal, 1st Earl of Pembroke, who undertook major construction at Chepstow Castle; and Henry Somerset, 1st Marquess of Worcester, who entertained his king at Raglan, and lost the castle at the end of the First English Civil War. William Wordsworth undertook the Wye Tour in 1798, composing Lines Written a Few Miles above Tintern Abbey during his visit, and Walter Savage Landor sought, unsuccessfully, to establish a landed estate at Llanthony Priory. Archdeacon Coxe's record of his journey to Llanthony in the spring of 1799 provides an illustration of the hazards of travelling in Wales at this time: "I would not recommend timid persons to pass this way in a carriage, for in the whole course of my travels, I seldom met with one more inconvenient and unsafe". In 1840, the Chartist leader John Frost and two colleagues were tried at the Shire Hall in Monmouth and sentenced to be hanged, drawn and quartered, the last such sentences to be passed in Britain. (Note: The sentences were subsequently commuted to transportation for life.) A statue in front of the Shire Hall commemorates Charles Stewart Rolls, the aviator and entrepreneur who was the first Briton to be killed in a plane crash.

The architecture of the county was first systematically covered by William Coxe in his two-volume, An Historical Tour in Monmouthshire, published in 1801. (Note: An earlier history, authored by David Williams, a Welsh minister, was published in 1796.) Coxe's Preface explains the Tour's genesis; "The present work owes its origin to an accidental excursion in Monmouthshire, in company with my friend Sir Richard Hoare, during the autumn of 1798. I was struck with the picturesque ruins of ancient castles, and I was animated with the view of mansions distinguished by the residence of illustrious persons". A detailed county history was undertaken by Sir Joseph Bradney, in his A History of Monmouthshire from the Coming of the Normans into Wales down to the Present Time; published in the early 20th century. More recent studies include those of the architectural historian John Newman, in his Gwent/Monmouthshire volume of the Pevsner Buildings of Wales series; and, most exhaustively, by Sir Cyril Fox and Lord Raglan, in their three-volume study, Monmouthshire Houses. The last was described by the architectural historian Peter Smith as "one of the most remarkable studies of vernacular architecture yet made in the British Isles, a landmark, in its own field, as significant as Darwin's Origin of Species".

== Buildings ==
Name	Location	Date Listed	Grid Ref. (Note: Sometimes known as OSGB36, the grid reference is based on the British national grid reference system used by the Ordnance Survey.) Geo-coordinates	Function	Notes	Reference Number	Image
Abbey Hotel	Llanthony	9 January 1956	SO2883227873; 51°56′41″N 3°02′12″W	Commercial	Built into the west range of Llanthony Priory	1940	Abbey Hotel
Abergavenny Castle	Abergavenny	7 May 1952	SO2994413962; 51°49′12″N 3°01′04″W	Castle	West of the main road on the southern approach to the town centre	2376	Abergavenny Castle
Court Farm Barn	Llanthony	9 January 1956	SO2870227868; 51°56′41″N 3°02′19″W	Barn	On the west side of the Llanthony Priory precinct about 110m from the priory ruins	1941	Court Farm Barn
Caldicot Castle	Caldicot	6 October 1953	ST4867988516; 51°35′35″N 2°44′32″W	Castle	About 300m east of the Church of St Mary and about 700m east of Caldicot	2006	Caldicot Castle
Castle House	Usk	16 February 1953	SO3775301088; 51°42′18″N 2°54′08″W	House	On a hillside a little north east of Usk town centre and below the castle	2128	Castle House
Chepstow Castle	Chepstow	12 June 1950	ST5333094113; 51°38′38″N 2°40′33″W	Castle	In a commanding position on the west bank of the River Wye	2475	Chepstow Castle
Church of St Aeddan	Bettws Newydd	9 January 1956	SO3622305874; 51°44′53″N 2°55′31″W	Church	At the south east end of the village, approached by lane running east, just to the north of Bettws Lodge	1962	Church of St Aeddan
Church of St Bridget	Skenfrith	19 November 1953	SO4560920340; 51°52′44″N 2°47′30″W	Church	Towards the north end of Skenfrith village and approximately 100m north west of Skenfrith Castle	2082	Church of St Bridget
Church of St Cadoc	Llangattock Lingoed	9 January 1956	SO3615220064; 51°52′32″N 2°55′44″W	Church	In a sloping churchyard, in the centre of Llangattock Lingoed	1955	Church of St Cadoc
Church of St David	Llangeview	18 November 1980	SO3968300694; 51°42′06″N 2°52′27″W	Church	In a rounded churchyard overlooking the A449 Usk exit, reached via lane running south from the B4235 just east of the bridge over the A449	2711	Church of St David
Church of St David	Llanthony	9 January 1956	SO2884927820; 51°56′40″N 3°02′12″W	Church	50m south of the priory buildings at Llanthony	1938	Church of St David
Church of St Jerome	Llangwm	19 August 1955	SO4329000557; 51°42′03″N 2°49′19″W	Church	Some 500m east of Llangwm Isaf church, in an isolated site	2028	Church of St Jerome
Church of St John	Llandenny	27 November 1953	SO4151203923; 51°43′52″N 2°50′54″W	Church	In the centre of the village of Llandenny, in an elevated position within an enclosed churchyard	17425	Church of St John
Church of St Martin	Cwmyoy	9 January 1956	SO2990523354; 51°54′16″N 3°01′13″W	Church	In the centre of Cwmyoy village on the east slope of the Vale of Ewyas	1933	Church of St Martin
Church of St Mary	Abergavenny	7 May 1952	SO3010114136; 51°49′17″N 3°00′56″W	Church	Key building in the group of historic buildings close to the main commercial centre of Abergavenny	2373	Church of St Mary
Church of St Mary	Caldicot	19 August 1955	ST4831688629; 51°35′39″N 2°44′51″W	Church	About 400m north east of the centre of Caldicot village	2019	Church of St Mary
Church of St Mary	Chepstow	12 June 1950	ST5359493973; 51°38′34″N 2°40′19″W	Church	At the end of the street within a churchyard crossed by a walkway to Lower Church Street	2594	Church of St Mary
Church of St Mary the Virgin	Llanfair Kilgeddin	9 January 1956	SO3558708684; 51°46′23″N 2°56′06″W	Church	Close to the river Usk 1.5 km (0.93 mi) north east of Pant-y-goitre	2782	Church of St Mary the Virgin
Church of St Mary	Magor	1 March 1963	ST4252986980; 51°34′44″N 2°49′51″W	Church	In the centre of the village and reached off Magor Square	2928	Church of St Mary
Church of St Mary	Portskewett	19 August 1955	ST4988888107; 51°35′23″N 2°43′29″W	Church	In the centre of Portskewett village at the junction of Main Road and Sudbrook Road	2044	Church of St Mary
Church of St Michael and All Angels	Gwernesney	18 November 1980	SO4148901805; 51°42′43″N 2°50′54″W	Church	Some 2 km (1.2 mi) east north east of the Usk junction of the A449, just north of the B4235	2715	Church of St Michael and All Angels
Church of St Nicholas	Grosmont	9 January 1956	SO4047624300; 51°54′51″N 2°52′00″W	Church	In the centre of Grosmont in a large churchyard	1947	Church of St Nicholas
Church of St Nicholas	Trellech	19 November 1953	SO5004305486; 51°44′45″N 2°43′30″W	Church	Prominently sited in the centre of Trellech	2106	Church of St Nicholas
Church of St Peter, St Paul and St John	Llantrisant	18 November 1980	ST3912196924; 51°40′04″N 2°52′54″W	Church	In the centre of Llantrisant	2718	Church of St Peter, St Paul and St John
Church of St Teilo	Llantilio Crossenny	19 November 1953	SO3988814983; 51°49′49″N 2°52′25″W	Church	In a churchyard in the centre of Llantilio Crossenny	2073	Church of St Teilo
Church of St Teilo	Llantilio Pertholey	9 January 1956	SO3115216336; 51°50′29″N 3°00′03″W	Church	Just off the old Hereford road about 3 km (1.9 mi) north of Abergavenny	2002	Church of St Teilo
Church of St Tewdric	Mathern	19 August 1955	ST5231390881; 51°36′53″N 2°41′24″W	Church	In the centre of Mathern	2040	Church of St Tewdric
Church of St Tysoi	Llansoy	19 August 1955	SO4421902396; 51°43′03″N 2°48′32″W	Church	At the southern end of Llansoy about 250m south of the junction with the main road	2029	Church of St Tysoi
Clytha Castle	Llanarth	9 January 1956	SO3639008390; 51°46′14″N 2°55′24″W	Folly	On a hillside south of Clytha Park off the old A40 road some 300m east of the gates to the park	1968	Clytha Castle
Clytha Park	Llanarth	9 January 1956	SO3667109025; 51°46′35″N 2°55′09″W	House	In a landscaped park north of the old A40 reached via a drive from the entrance opposite the junction with the road to Bettws Newydd	1966	Clytha Park
Cross at Croes Lwyd	Raglan	31 January 2001	SO4005306992; 51°45′30″N 2°52′12″W	Cross	On the southern side of Broom Lane about 400m east of Broom House, at the bottom of the garden at Whitecross Cottage	24716	Cross at Croes Lwyd
Great Castle House	Monmouth	15 August 1974	SO5070912915; 51°48′46″N 2°42′59″W	House	In the castle enclosure at the highest point of the town and just north of the town square	2217	Great Castle House
Grosmont Castle	Grosmont	9 January 1956	SO4053224454; 51°54′56″N 2°51′58″W	Castle	On a flat elevated plateau, some 100m north west of Grosmont village, approached along a narrow lane from the main street	1949	Grosmont Castle
Llanthony Priory	Llanthony	9 January 1956	SO2885427872; 51°56′41″N 3°02′11″W	Church	In Llanthony village in the Vale of Eywas	1939	Llanthony Priory
Llanvihangel Court	Llanvihangel Crucorney	6 May 1952	SO3278120411; 51°52′42″N 2°58′40″W	House	In Llanvihangel Crucorney about 400m south east of the Church of St Michael	1919	Llanvihangel Court
Llanvihangel Court Stable Block	Llanvihangel Crucorney	29 January 1998	SO3279420362; 51°52′40″N 2°58′40″W	Stables	About 30m south of Llanvihangel Court	19288	Llanvihangel Court Stable Block
Llwyn-celyn Farmhouse	Llanvihangel Crucorney	9 January 1956	SO3095021807; 51°53′26″N 3°00′17″W	Farmhouse	On a knoll on the west side of Stanton about 1.5 km (0.93 mi) north west of Llanvihangel Crucorney	1937	Llwyn-celyn Farmhouse
Mathern Palace	Mathern	6 October 1953	ST5229090821; 51°36′51″N 2°41′26″W	House	In the centre of Mathern village about 50m south west of the Church of St Tewdric	2007	Mathern Palace
Monmouth Castle	Monmouth	15 August 1974	SO5067512872; 51°48′44″N 2°43′01″W	Castle	On the east bank of the River Monnow at the highest point of the town and just north of the town square	2216	Monmouth Castle
Monnow Bridge	Monmouth	15 August 1974	SO5046012508; 51°48′32″N 2°43′12″W	Bridge	At the entrance to Monmouth's principal commercial street which leads up the hill to the town square from the south-west	2218	Monnow Bridge
Pen-y-Clawdd Court	Llanvihangel Crucorney	6 May 1952	SO3103020099; 51°52′31″N 3°00′12″W	House	About 1500m south west of the Church of St Michael, Llanvihangel Crucorney approached by a lane from the small settlement round the old Llanvihangel station	1926	Pen-y-Clawdd Court
Penallt Old Church	Penallt	19 November 1953	SO5219810732; 51°47′36″N 2°41′40″W	Church	In the very northernmost corner of Trellech Community about 1000m south of Monmouth, on the B4239 road at the junction by High Glanau	2104	Penallt Old Church
Port Wall	Chepstow	24 March 1975	ST5325993947; 51°38′33″N 2°40′37″W	Walls, railings, gates	Extending from near Chepstow Castle, uphill to the town gate and crossing to the quarry above the station	2477	Port Wall
St Mary's Priory Church	Usk	1 April 1974	SO3789200811; 51°42′09″N 2°54′01″W	Church	A town centre church, just south of the main thoroughfare with a large walled churchyard	2123	St Mary's Priory Church
Priory Gatehouse	Usk	16 February 1953	SO3783600795; 51°42′09″N 2°54′03″W	Gatehouse	At right angles to the churchyard entrance, on a corner site, facing up Priory Street to Twyn Square	2126	Priory Gatehouse
Raglan Castle	Raglan	19 November 1953	SO4143308324; 51°46′14″N 2°51′01″W	Castle	Magnificently sited 0.25 km (0.16 mi) north of Raglan and reached by a private drive from the A40	2101	Raglan Castle
Old Wye Bridge	Chepstow	24 March 1975	ST5361094359; 51°38′46″N 2°40′19″W	Bridge	Continuing the line of Bridge Street. Aligned almost due north–south, crossing a bend in the River Wye, here the boundary between Wales and England. The north part of the bridge is in England	2479	Old Wye Bridge
Shire Hall	Monmouth	27 June 1952	SO5078012837; 51°48′43″N 2°42′55″W	Shire Hall	In the town square in the centre of Monmouth with a cobbled area to the front and sides spreading as far as the line of the road and including the statue of Charles Stewart Rolls, the co-founder of Rolls-Royce	2228	Shire Hall
Tintern Abbey	Tintern	29 September 2000	SO5329100037; 51°41′50″N 2°40′38″W	Church	In a prominent position on the right bank of the river Wye on the east side of the A466	24037	Tintern Abbey
Town Gate	Chepstow	6 December 1950	ST5327993793; 51°38′28″N 2°40′36″W	Walls, railings, gates	At the main entrance to the fortified town between Moor Street outside the gate to the west and the High Street to the east	2476	Town Gate
Treowen	Mitchel Troy	1 May 1952	SO4615311109; 51°47′46″N 2°46′56″W	House	About 4.5 km (2.8 mi) west south west of Monmouth and 1 km (0.62 mi) north north east of Dingestow church, prominently situated amidst its own parkland just north of the road between Dingestow and Wonastow	2065	Treowen
Usk Castle	Usk	16 February 1953	SO3767701089; 51°42′18″N 2°54′12″W	Castle	On a spur on the hillside a short distance north east of the town	2127	Usk Castle
White Castle	Llantilio Crossenny	19 November 1953	SO3795616754; 51°50′45″N 2°54′07″W	Castle	Overlooking Llanvetherine, some 3 km (1.9 mi) north west of village of Llantilio Crossenny	2079	White Castle

== See also ==
- Listed buildings in Wales
- Grade I listed buildings in Herefordshire
- Grade I listed buildings in Forest of Dean
- Grade I listed buildings in Newport
- Grade I listed buildings in Torfaen
- Grade II* listed buildings in Blaenau Gwent – there are currently no Grade I listed buildings in Blaenau Gwent
- Grade I listed buildings in Powys
- Grade II* listed buildings in Monmouthshire
- Scheduled Monuments in Monmouthshire
- Registered historic parks and gardens in Monmouthshire

== Sources ==
- Aslet, Clive (2005). Landmarks of Britain. London: Hodder & Stoughton. ISBN 978-0-34073-5107. "editions:O60YB-B7LYMC."
- Bradney, Joseph (1991). A History of Monmouthshire: The Hundred of Skenfrith, Volume 1 Part 1. London: Academy Books. ISBN 978-1-87336-1092. OCLC 669714197.
- Clark, Arthur (1953). Raglan Castle and the Civil War in Monmouthshire. Newport: Newport & Monmouthshire Branch of the Historical Association and Chepstow Society. OCLC 249172228.
- — (1980). The Story of Monmouthshire, Volume 1, From the earliest times to the Civil War. Monmouth: Monnow Press. ISBN 978-0-95066-1810. OCLC 866777550.
- — (1979). The Story of Monmouthshire, Volume 2, From the Civil War to Present Times. Monmouth: Monnow Press. ISBN 978-0-95066-1803. OCLC 503676874.
- Coxe, William (1995) [1801]. An Historical Tour of Monmouthshire: Volume 1. Cardiff: Merton Priory Press. ISBN 978-1-8989-3709-8. OCLC 34476778.
- — (1995) [1801]. An Historical Tour of Monmouthshire: Volume 2. Cardiff: Merton Priory Press. ISBN 978-1-8989-3708-1. OCLC 34476778.
- Evans, Cyril James Oswald (1953). Monmouthshire: Its History and Topography. Cardiff: William Lewis Printers. OCLC 2415203.
- Fox, Cyril; Raglan, Lord (1994). Medieval Houses. Monmouthshire Houses. Vol. 1. Cardiff: Merton Priory Press Ltd & The National Museum of Wales. ISBN 978-0-72000-3963. OCLC 916186124.
- Hando, Fred (1944). The Pleasant Land of Gwent. Newport: R. H. Johns Ltd. OCLC 2534151.
- — (1951). Journeys in Gwent. Newport: R. H. Johns Ltd. OCLC 30202753.
- — (1954). Monmouthshire Sketch Book. Newport: R. H. Johns Ltd. OCLC 30166792.
- — (1958). Out and About in Monmouthshire. Newport: R. H. Johns Ltd. OCLC 30235598.
- Hayman, Richard (2016). Wye. Woonton Almeley: Logaston Press. ISBN 978-1-91083-9096.
- Jenkins, Simon (2008). Wales: Churches, Houses, Castles. London: Penguin Books. ISBN 978-0-71399-8931.
- Kenyon, John (2010). The Medieval Castles of Wales. Cardiff: University of Wales Press. ISBN 978-0-708-32180-5. OCLC 828219275.
- McCloy, Robert (2013). "Local government". In Williams, Chris; Croll, Andy; Griffiths, Ralph A. (eds.). The Twentieth Century. The Gwent County History. Vol. 5. Cardiff: University of Wales Press. ISBN 978-0-7083-2648-0. OCLC 855346482.
- Mitchell, Julian (2010). The Wye Tour And Its Artists. Woonton Almeley: Logaston Press. ISBN 978-1-90666-3322. OCLC 648769582.
- Newman, John (2000). Gwent/Monmouthshire. The Buildings of Wales. London: Penguin Books. ISBN 978-0-30009-6309.
- Smith, Peter (1975). Houses of the Welsh Countryside. London: Her Majesty's Stationery Office. ISBN 978-0-1170-04757. OCLC 868639211.
- Tyerman, Hugo; Warner, Sydney (1951). Arthur Mee (ed.). Monmouthshire. The King's England. London: Hodder & Stoughton. OCLC 764861.
