= Prior of Llanthony Prima =

Head of Llanthony Priory

The prior of Llanthony Prima was the head of Llanthony Priory in Wales and, from its founding in 1136 to its independence in 1205, the prior of Lanthony Secunda.

The first prior was Ernisius, in c. 1118, and the last was David Kemp, who surrendered the priory in 1538 during the dissolution of the monasteries. The last independent prior was John Adams, as in 1481 Llanthony Prima was made a cell of Lanthony Secunda.

== Llanthony Priory ==
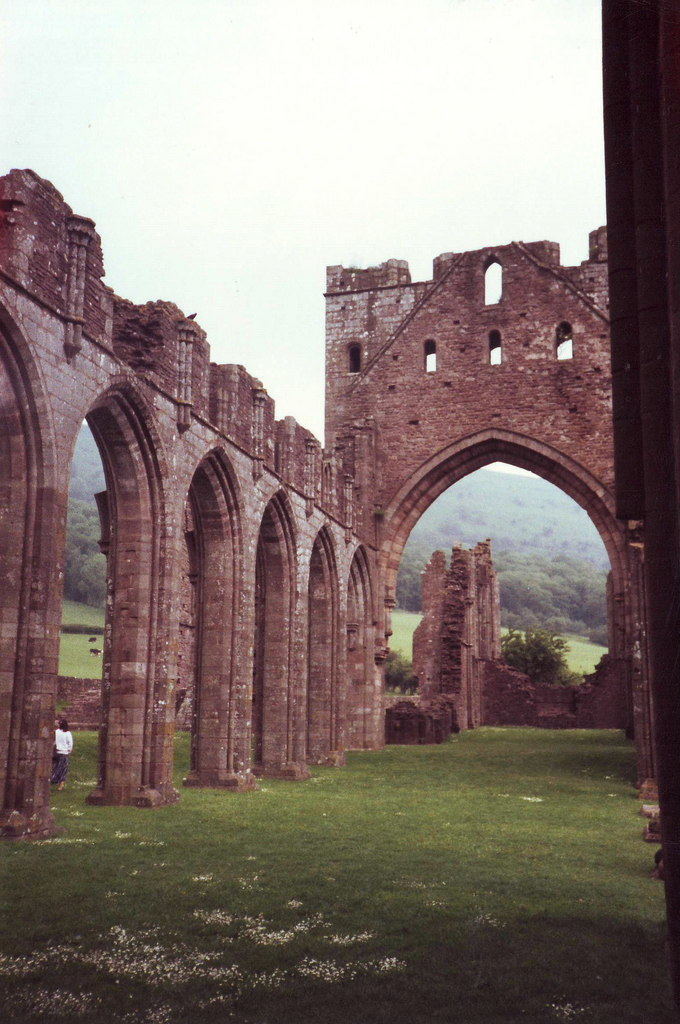
Ruins of Llanthony Priory in 1993

Llanthony Priory began as a hermitage at the beginning of the twelfth century on the edge of the Black Mountains, founded by William de Lacy, a household knight of Hugh de Lacy, and Ernisius, a former chaplain of Queen Matilda. With the support of Queen Matilda and possibly Henry I it developed into an Augustinian monastery c. 1118.

In 1136, most of the canons fled Llanthony after lawlessness followed the death of Henry I and founded Lanthony Secunda as a cell of Llanthony Prima outside Gloucester. Lanthony Secunda remained a cell with a shared prior until 1205, when it gained independence.

By "ancient custom", the canons of Llanthony Prima elected their prior without their patron's consent. In 1322, when the king was Llanthony's patron, this custom was confirmed after an investigation found that the priory had always elected priors without licence from their patron, "by virtue of a deed of Walter de Lacy".

In 1481 Edward IV granted Lanthony Secunda, then under Henry Deane, a charter making Llanthony Prima a cell of its former daughter house. The charter required that Lanthony Secunda maintain at Llanthony Prima a dative prior and four canons.

== Priors ==
From	Until	Incumbent	Notes
c. 1118	c. 1121	Ernisius	First prior. Took up residence at Llanthony c. 1103, likely resigned c. 1121.
c. 1121	1131	Robert de Bethune	Elected bishop of Hereford in 1129, consecrated 1131.
1131	1137	Robert de Braci	Third prior of Llanthony Prima and first prior of Lanthony Secunda. Died shortly after the church at Llanthony Secunda was consecrated.
1137	1150	William of Wycombe	Forced to resign in 1150.
1150	c. 1174	Clement of Llanthony	Formerly sub-prior of Llanthony.
c. 1174	c. 1185×1189	Roger of Norwich	Formerly sub-prior of Llanthony.
c. 1185×1189	1203	Geoffrey de Henlaw	Appointed bishop of St Davids in 1203.
1203	c. 1205	Martin	Eighth prior of Llanthony Prima and sixth prior of Lanthony Secunda. The two houses separated during his priorship. Elected to continue as prior of Llanthony Prima.
c. 1205		Roger de Godestre	Reached a final settlement with Lanthony Secunda over the apportionment of assets.
c. 1217×1224	c. 1227	Walter	
c. 1227	c. 1236	Stephen	
Occurred 1236		Philip	
Occurred 1241, 1242		David	
Occurred 1251		Thomas	
Occurred 1253		Simon	According to the king, Simon's priorship was after the statutes of Mortmain. According to a later prior of Llanthony, it was before.
Occurred c. 1258×1259		Bartholomew	
1265	1279	Walter (Thope, Tope, de Langedon)	
1279	1295	Nicholas	Was pardoned for receiving the outlaw Peter de Marines in 1285.
1296	1301	Thomas of Gloucester (Glocestria, Glovernia)	Resigned at the beginning of 1301. In the same year Robert Winchelsey, archbishop of Canterbury, complained that the former prior was not compliant with monastic discipline with the tacit permission of the bishop of St Davids.
1301	1304	Nicholas	May be Nicholas de Feckenham.
1304	c. 1314	Walter de Langeleye	
Occurred 1316		John of Kingston (Kyngeston)	
c. 1321	c. 1337	John of Rufford	Probably died 1338, certainly deceased by 1348.
c. 1338	c. 1357	John of Gloucester	Likely deceased 1358.
c. 1358	c. 1359	Henry Ragon	
Occurred 1362		Adam	
1363	1376	Nicholas de Trinbey (Trilley, Trillek, de Trinleye, Trinbeye)	While saying the Office of the Dead in c. 1373 he was attacked by three canons and blinded. He resigned after the attack and was recorded as still alive in 1380.
1376	c. 1391	John (de) Yatton	Was imprisoned in 1386 for failing to render tithes to the king.
c. 1395	c. 1407	John de Welyngton (Welynton, Wellyngton, Wellynton, Welynton, Wellington)	One of the canons who had attacked Nicholas de Trinbey. He had previously been injured by Nicholas.
1409	c. 1417	William Cromp (Crompe)	
c. 1434	c. 1439	John	May be John Pembruge.
c. 1447	c. 1469	John Pembruge (Penburgh)	He was recorded as dying in August 1469. Since his successor is recorded earlier, either the date is erroneous or he resigned before his death.
c. 1466	1481	John Adams	Last prior of an independent Llanthony Prima. He was accused of having "wasted and destroyed the profits, revenues, and emoluments" of the priory.
1481		Reginald de Braose	Dative prior of Llanthony Prima.
Occurred 1524		John Abyndon	Dative prior of Llanthony Prima.
Occurred 1534		John Chester	Dative prior of Llanthony Prima.
Occurred 1534		John Ambrose	Dative prior of Llanthony Prima. Acknowledged royal supremacy in 1534.
Occurred 1535		William Ambrose	Dative prior of Llanthony Prima.
1537		Henry Wydon	Dative prior of Llanthony Prima.
1538		David Kemp	Dative prior of Llanthony Prima. Llanthony Prima was dissolved in 1538 as one of the lesser monasteries.
