= Martin (prior of Llanthony) =

- Prior of Llanthony Priory
- Elected: c. 1203
- Term ended: c. 1205 (Lanthony Secunda) c. 1205×1209 (Llanthony Prima)
- Predecessor: Geoffrey de Henlaw
- Successor: Walter of Monmouth (Lanthony Secunda); Roger de Godestre (Llanthony Prima)

Martin was the eighth prior of Llanthony Prima and the sixth prior of Lanthony Secunda, serving from c. 1203 until c. 1205. During his priorship he became involved in a dispute with Henry de Bohun, earl of Hereford, the patron of Lanthony Secunda.

Llanthony Prima and Lanthony Secunda separated during his priorship, and he chose to remain prior of Prima. He is last recorded in 1204x1205, while his successor at Llanthony Prima, Roger de Godestre, is first recorded in 1209.

== Llanthony Priory ==
Martin was elected the eighth prior of Llanthony Prima and the sixth prior of Lanthony Secunda c. 1203, succeeding Geoffrey de Henlaw who had been elected bishop of St Davids. Martin may have been the preferred candidate of Henry de Bohun, earl of Hereford, who had lobbied to have his predecessor elevated to the bishopric to remove him as prior. He was the last prior of both Llanthony Prima and Lanthony Secunda before the two houses separated during his priorship, possibly at the instigation of Henry, Secunda's patron.

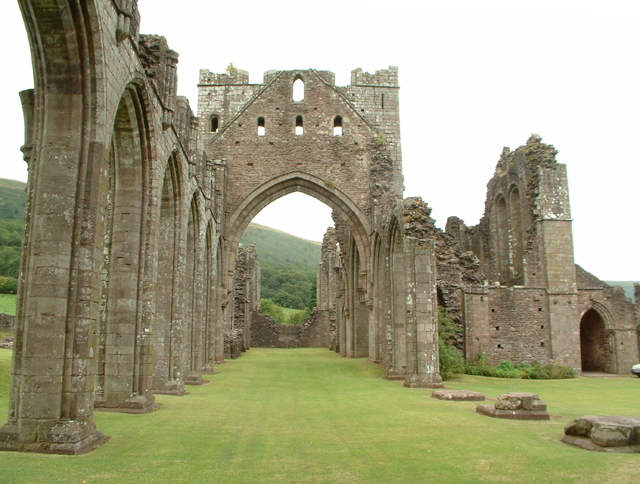
Ruins of Llanthony Prima

If Martin was Henry's preferred candidate relations between them had deteriorated by 1204, when Henry had unspecified grievances against the prior. The cause of the dispute is unknown, although Henry held strong views on the affairs of Llanthony Priory which may have conflicted with Martin's. Ann Geddes proposes that the dispute may have concerned the separation of Prima and Secunda.

On 22 December 1204 Martin met Henry in an attempt to mend relations, accompanied by four canons from Llanthony Priory and two from Cirencester Abbey, including Alexander Neckam. Speaking on Martin's behalf, Alexander told the earl that Martin had "bound himself" to follow whatever Geoffrey fitz Peter advised and that Henry wished to remedy his personal wrongdoing and address any grievances. Henry rejected the overture, saying that he found Martin "unstable and unfaithful in word and deed", and that he did not believe anything that had been said.

Henry did, however, agree to meet the canons in the king's court, which advised that a loveday be held on 12 January 1205. The outcome is not known, but Walter of Monmouth is recorded as prior of Lanthony Secunda shortly afterwards, and Ann Geddes proposes that one of Henry's demands was for Martin's resignation. J. N. Langston writes that he chose to remain prior of Llanthony Prima. Martin was last recorded in a document dated 1204x1205; his successor at Prima, Roger de Godestre, is first recorded in 1209.

He is also recorded in a charter of Geoffrey de Henlaw, the bishop of St Davids, dated 1203x1205. The History of Llanthony Priory contained a chapter on Martin, but the chapter is now lost.
