= Court Farmhouse =

Court Farmhouse may refer to:

- Court Farmhouse, Llanthony, Monmouthshire, Wales
- Court Farmhouse, Llanover, Monmouthshire, Wales
