= History of Llanthony Priory =

Medieval Welsh history

- Author(s): Unknown
- Language: Latin
- State of existence: Extant
- Manuscript(s): British Library, Cotton MS Julius D X
- First printed edition: 1661
- Subject: Llanthony Priory

The History of Llanthony Priory is a medieval Latin text covering the history of Llanthony Priory from c. 1100 to c. 1250. The author is unknown, but scholarship has proposed Gerald of Wales or Roger of Norwich as possible partial authors.

Originally arranged into three books, it is partially preserved in a single manuscript, Cotton MS Julius D X, held at the British Library. The third book and three chapters of the second book are lost. It is the primary source for the twelfth-century history of Llanthony Priory.

== Background ==
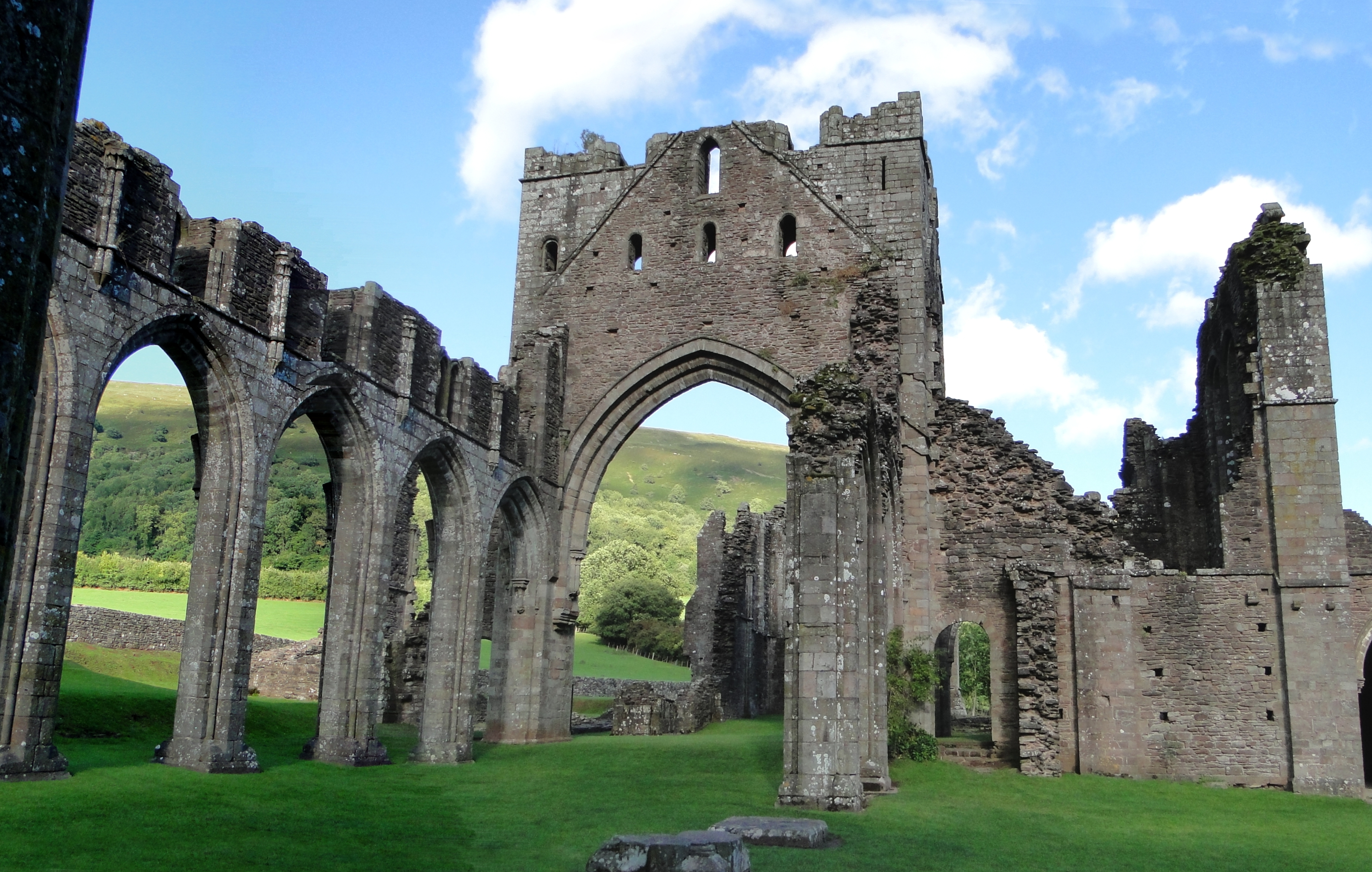
Ruins of Llanthony Priory

William de Lacy, a household knight of Hugh de Lacy, became a hermit on the edge of the Black Mountains at the beginning of the twelfth century. In 1103 he was joined by Ernisius, a hermit who had previously resided at Edgarsley, and who had formerly served as chaplain to Queen Matilda. With Hugh de Lacy's support they built a church that was dedicated in 1108 by Urban, bishop of Llandaff, and Reynelm, bishop of Hereford.

The hermitage developed into an Augustinian monastery with the support of Queen Matilda and possibly Henry I. Canons from Merton, Holy Trinity, and Colchester visited Llanthony to instruct the community in the Rule of St Augustine, and Ernisius was elected its first prior.

In 1136, most of the canons fled Llanthony after lawlessness followed the death of Henry I. They first took up residence in Hereford, then moved to a new site at Hyde, outside Gloucester, where they founded Lanthony Secunda as a cell of Llanthony Prima. In 1205, Lanthony Secunda became independent of Llanthony Prima.

== Composition ==
=== Dating ===
The History of Llanthony Priory covers the period from c. 1100 to c. 1250, but evidence within the text indicates that it was written in stages, with some sections probably composed before the end of the period covered by the work. Evidence for this includes references to living oral sources for the priorship of Clement of Llanthony, who died c. 1167×1174, and a reference to an incident between Roger of Norwich and a Canterbury monk in c. 1170s – c. 1180s, described as having occurred "in these our days".

=== Authorship ===
The authors of the History of Llanthony Priory are unknown. The text indicates the author was well-educated with knowledge of classical Latin authors. Michael Richter has proposed partial authorship by Roger of Norwich and perhaps by Gilbert, and Robert Bartlett has proposed partial authorship by Gerald of Wales.

==== Roger of Norwich ====
Michael Richter proposed that Roger of Norwich, a twelfth-century prior of Llanthony, may have written sections of the History. Earlier priors of Llanthony, including Robert de Bethune and William of Wycombe, were known as writers, and a letter by Roger preserved in Gerald of Wales's Speculum Ecclesiae indicates that Roger had the education needed to compose the History. Rogers letter opens with the words "Benedictus Deus", the same words found at the beginning of the History.

The surviving manuscript is written in one hand up to the entry on Clement of Llanthony, Roger's predecessor, and in another hand from Roger's entry onwards. Richter argues that the change indicates a break in the exemplar, with a new author continuing the work after Clement. He also proposes that a later prior of Llanthony, possibly Gilbert, wrote later sections, based on wording reused from a letter by Gerald of Wales to that unknown prior, preserved in the Speculum Duorum.

==== Gerald of Wales ====
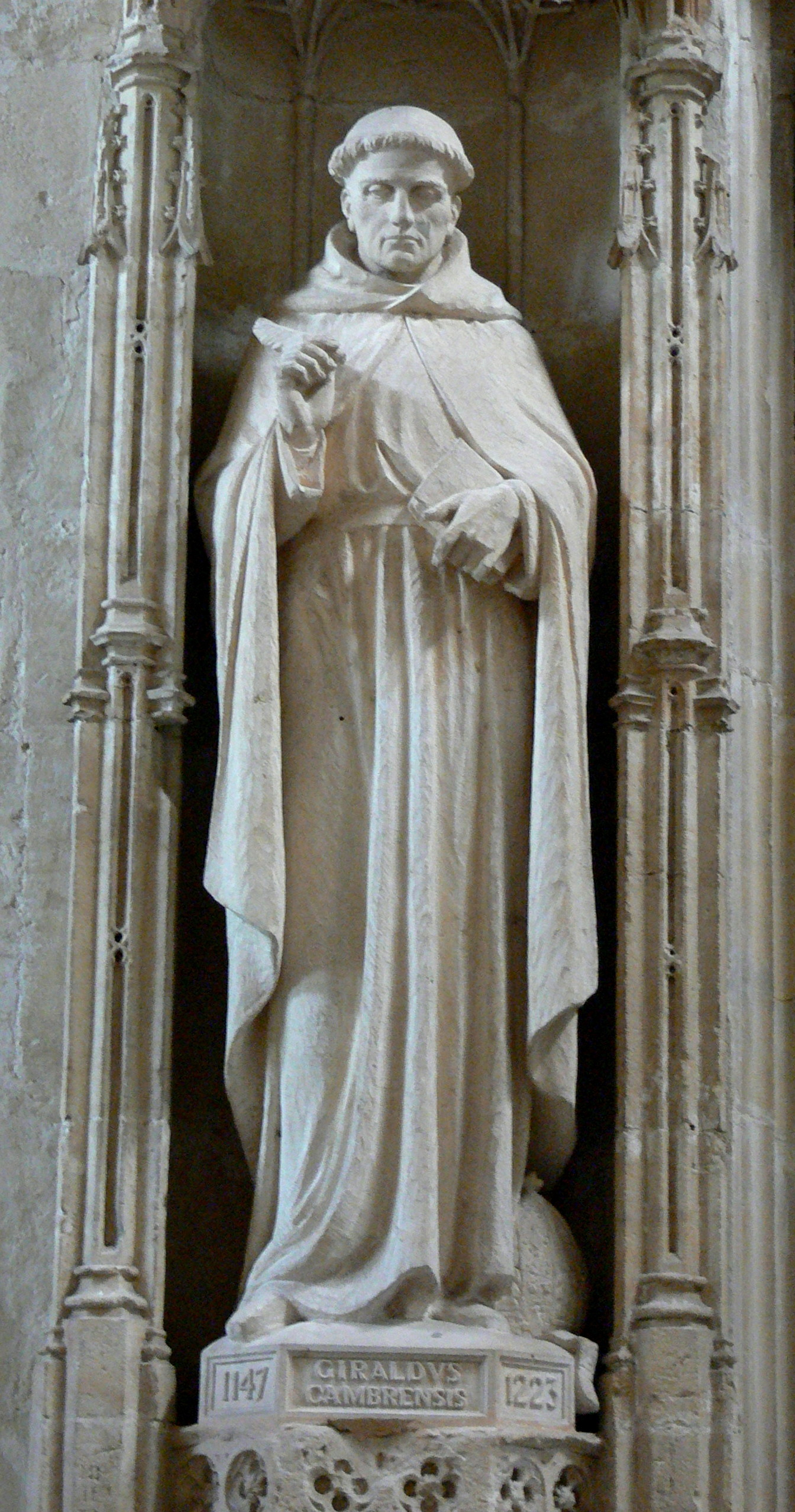
Statue of Gerald of Wales in St Davids Cathedral

Michael Richter proposed a complicated relationship between the History of Llanthony Priory and Gerald of Wales. He argued that some passages were copied from Gerald's Itinerarium Kambriae into the History, that Gerald of Wales's Speculum Duorum drew on the History, and that Gerald's notes, later used for his Speculum Ecclesiae, were the source for the passage about Prior Roger of Norwich and the Canterbury monks.

Robert Bartlett proposed instead that Gerald, who had close personal ties with Llanthony, wrote the earlier sections of the History. Bartlett points to duplicate passages in the History and in Gerald's known works, as well as shorter repeated phrases. These include "let us follow up with certain things that are not to be kept silent, which happened shortly before", which occurs in De Rebus in relation to the bishop of St Davids and the History concerning Roger. Bartlett treats these shorter turns of phrase as more evidentiary, since there is less reason for another author to have copied them.

Bartlett also identifies shared positions in Gerald's works and the History. Both favour clerics over monks, support Llanthony Prima against Llanthony Secunda, and argue for the superiority of the Augustinian canons among religious orders.

Bartlett also argues the History was not written by a member of the priory. The preface says it was written "at the request of certain (of the) brethren", which distances the writer from the canons at Llanthony. Later chapters suggest close familiarity with the practices of religious orders, but do not read as the work of a member of the community.

== Summary ==
The History of Llanthony Priory was arranged in three books and twenty-eight chapters, of which seventeen survive. It recounts the first two centuries of Llanthony Priory, from its founding by William de Lacy and Ernisius in the early twelfth century to the time of Thomas, the fourteenth prior of Llanthony. The surviving text breaks off in the middle of the seventh chapter of the second book. Three later chapters of the second book and all the third book are lost.

=== First book ===
The first five chapters concern the founding of the priory. William, a household knight of Hugh de Lacy, became a hermit in the vale of Llanthony. In 1103 he was joined by Ernisius, who had been living as a rural hermit by the forest of Cannock, and together they built, in a "rough fashion", a church that was dedicated in 1108 in honour of St John the Baptist.

Hugh de Lacy, their patron, endowed them with "many gifts and wide estates", but William and Ernisius refused further grants, believing that what they had already accepted "was sufficient for them".

Chapter five recounts the establishment of the priory, and how those at Llanthony chose the Rule of St Augustine and were instructed in it by men from the monasteries of Merton, Holy Trinity, and Colchester.

The sixth and seventh chapters are heavily opinionated and depart from the priory's chronology, dealing instead with the vices of the cloister and the conduct of monastic superiors and inferiors. The author criticises superiors for disdaining the hardship of the community, the inferiors for being resentful and disobedient, and both for their pursuit of luxuries.

The final three chapters of the first book discuss the priorships of Ernisius, Robert de Bethune, and Robert de Braci, extolling their virtues and praising them. They tell of how Ernisius was tricked by Queen Matilda into accepting further grants, how Walter of Gloucester retired in old age to the priory, and how Robert de Bethune was "unwillingly dragged away from his sweet retreat" to become bishop of Hereford.

=== Second book ===
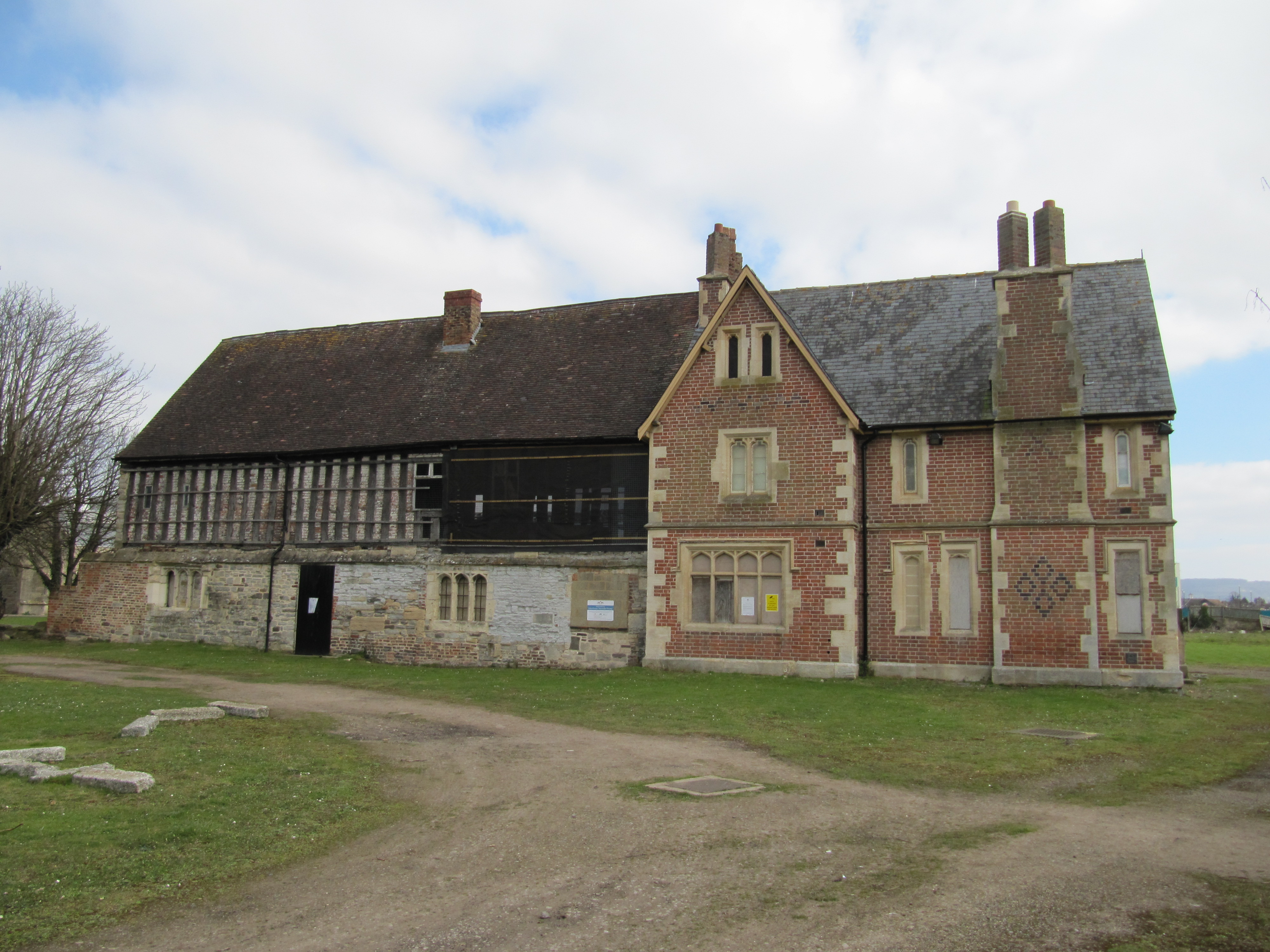
Lanthony Secunda, founded after the canons fled Llanthony in 1135

The second book opens with the partial abandonment of Llanthony Priory. After Henry I's death in 1135, lawlessness broke out in the region and a Welsh lord and his retainers, fleeing their enemies, took up uninvited residence in Llanthony. The priory sent a messenger to Robert de Bethune, who was now bishop of Hereford, and he invited the priory to take up residence with him, an offer which most of the canons accepted. The second chapter recounts how, after two years' residence in Hereford "at the bishop's expense", Robert secured a permanent home for the canons. He persuaded Miles, the earl of Hereford, to provide them a site in Gloucestershire, where Lanthony Secunda was founded.

The third chapter concerns the priorship of William of Wycombe. It praises him for his writing and refers to his friendship with Robert de Bethune and the confirmation of Lanthony Secunda as a cell of Llanthony Prima.

The fourth chapter covers the "devastation and despoliation" of Llanthony Prima. It says the canons of Llanthony refused to return to Llanthony Prima even after it was safe, preferring the comforts available at Gloucestershire. It also accuses them of transferring treasures and relics from the mother house to Lanthony Secunda.

Chapters five and six cover the resignation of William of Wycombe and the priorships of Clement of Llanthony and Roger of Norwich. The chapters present William's resignation as forced by the Earl of Hereford and supported by the canons who disliked William's austerity. Clement receives more favourable treatment, and is described as an excellent writer, an effective leader, and a prior who cared for the mother church of Llanthony Prima.

Roger is described at his election as "mild benignity and sociable friendliness", but the author says that the office changed him until he "deserved more to be feared by them than loved". He is also said to have been venerated by "outsiders and the chief men of the country", and to have restored the "religious way of life" at Ixworth Priory at the request of Geoffrey Ridel, the bishop of Ely.

The seventh chapter, titled How the advocates of the mother church protested its right, opens with a digression against the monks of Canterbury, which the author said was included "to suppress the pride of the monks of Canterbury". It recounts Roger's visit to Canterbury, where he asked to celebrate mass at the church of the Holy Trinity but was refused and told to use "some external chapel among the clerks". When the same monk later visited Lanthony and asked to celebrate mass in the priory's chapel of St Mary, he was told to go into the town and "celebrate mass at St Peter's, among and with the monks".

The chapter then attacks monks more broadly before returning to Roger. At the end of his life, according to the author, he fell into "the vice of gluttony" and was punished with paralysis. The work ends in the middle of this chapter.

=== Missing chapters ===
Three chapters of the second book, and all eight chapters of the third book, are missing. Eight of the lost chapters concerned priors of Llanthony: Geoffrey of Henlaw, Martin, Roger of Godest, Walter, Stephen, Philip, David, and Thomas. One lost chapter dealt with the eating of meat, and two concerned the separation of Llanthony Prima and Lanthony Secunda.

== Manuscript and publication history ==
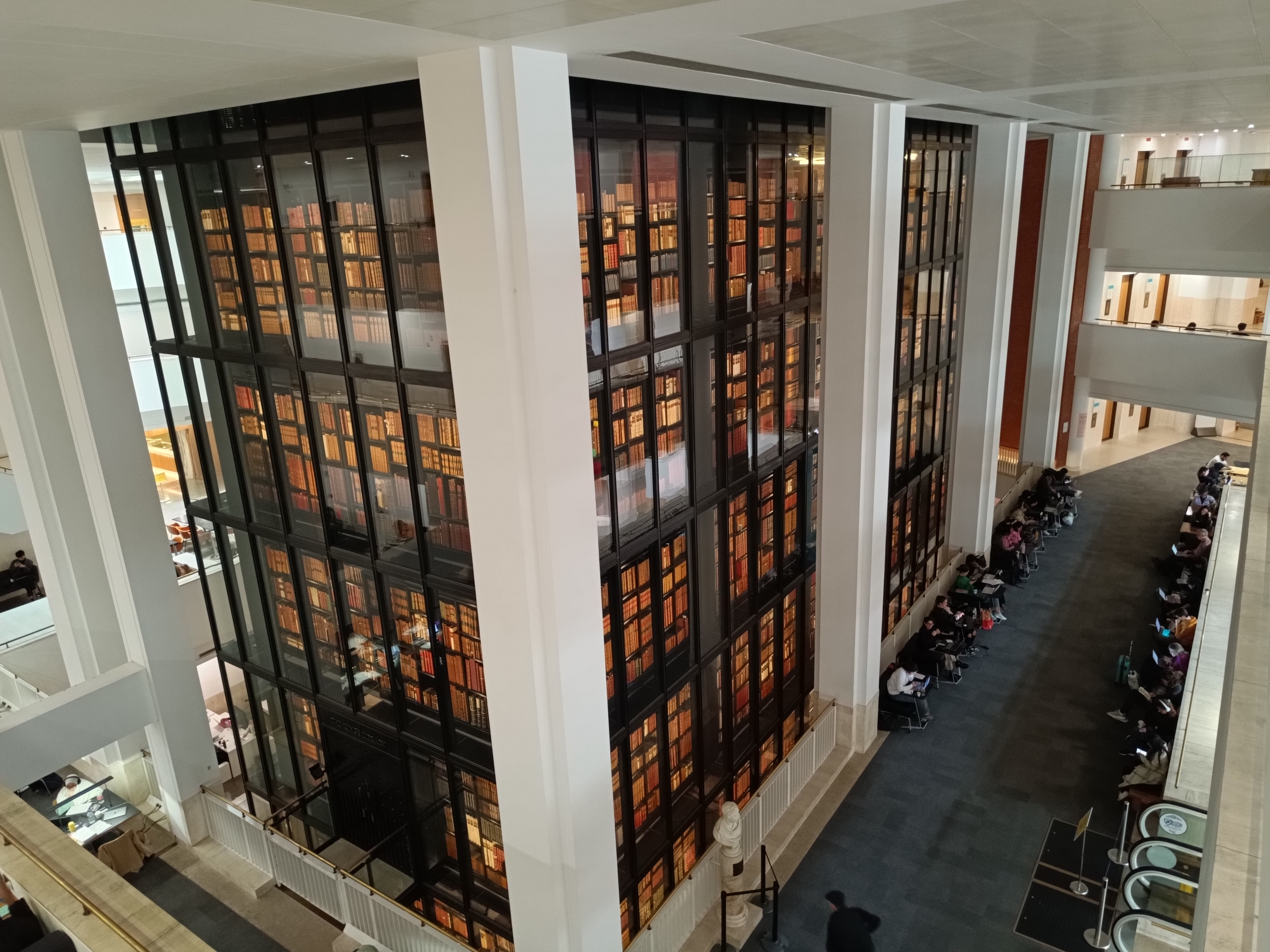
The British Library, where the surviving manuscript of the History of Llanthony Priory is held

The History of Llanthony Priory survives in a single manuscript, Cotton MS Julius D X, held in the British Library. The manuscript measures 170 × 155 mm and consists of 54 folios. It is made up of three four-leaf quires, a two-leaf quire, a seven-leaf quire, a five-leaf quire, and two single folio insertions.

The manuscript contains three works, each connected with Llanthony Priory or the surrounding region. Folios 2 to 28 contain Speculum uite Roberti Herefordensis episcopi by William of Wycombe, folios 28 to 30 contain a history and genealogy of the lords of Brecon, and folios 31 to 53^{v} contain the History of Llanthony Priory. The two single folio insertions, folios 1 and 54, are leaves from a psalter.

The History of Llanthony Priory is written in two hands. Folios 31 to 50 are in a late thirteenth-century hand, while folios 50^{v} to 53^{v} are in "fully formed Anglicana", dated to c. 1300.

The text is incomplete, ending in the middle of chapter 2.7, four lines into folio 53^{v}. The incompleteness is due to unfinished copying rather than the later loss of folios. The surviving text is approximately 10,700 words long.

The manuscript almost certainly originated at Llanthony. It is not listed in the fourteenth-century library catalogue of Lanthony Secunda, and the criticism directed at Lanthony Secunda in the text makes Llanthony Prima the more likely home, though it may have been held at Lanthony Secunda and left the collection before the catalogue was compiled.

The manuscript was owned by Thomas Talbot and John Weever before it came into the possession of Robert Cotton. It was damaged in the Cottonian fire of 1731, leaving some passages difficult to read, although their meaning remains clear.

=== Publication history ===
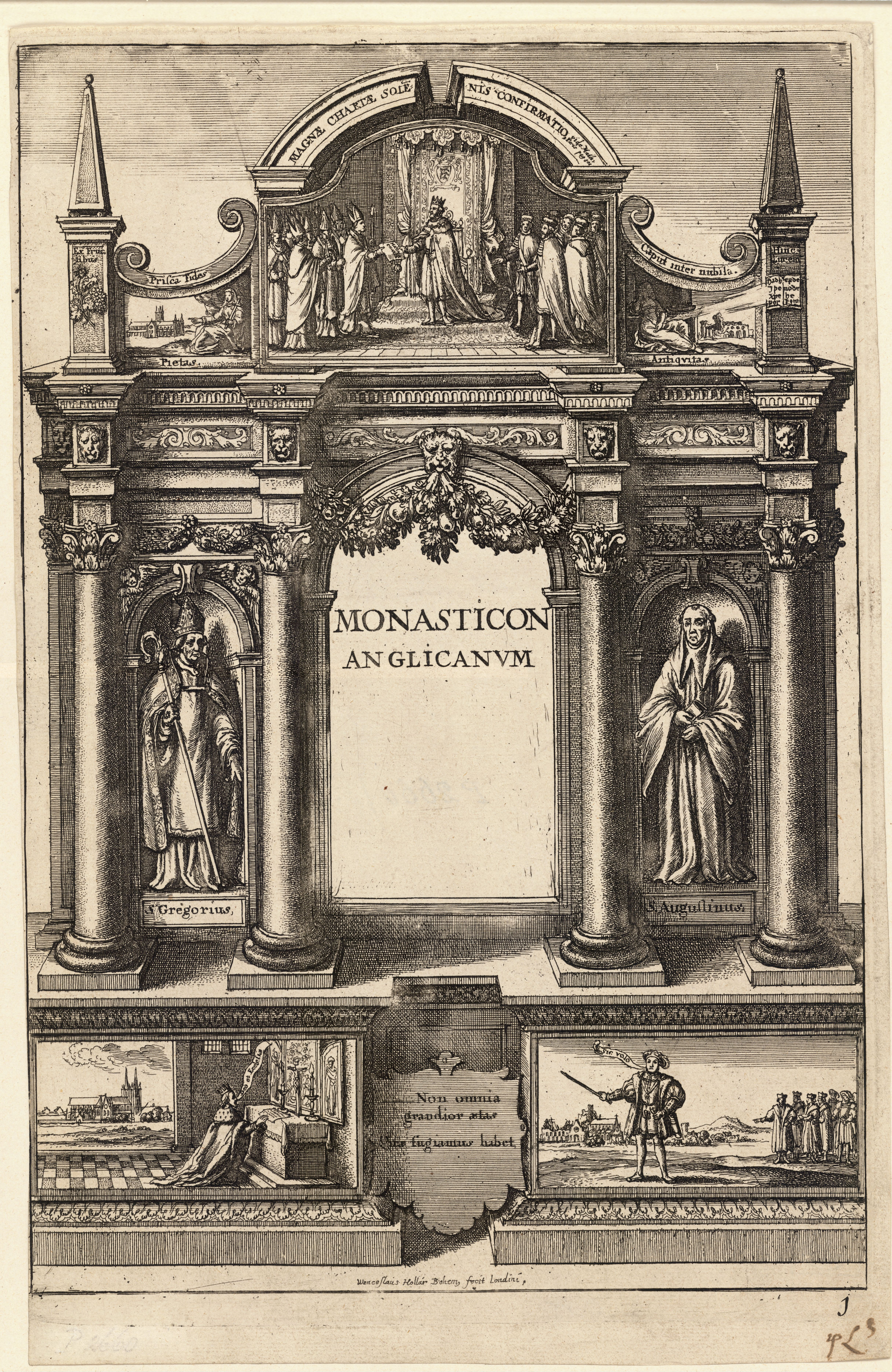
Title page of Dugdale's Monasticon

In 1661, about 60 percent of the text was printed in Dugdale's Monasticon, and again in a revised nineteenth-century edition. From the first book, Dugdale omitted chapters six and seven, which concern the vices of the cloister, as well as two sentences from the chapter on Ernisius and a long section from the chapter on Robert de Bethune.

From the second book, Dugdale omitted a long section from the fourth chapter on the removal of relics from Llanthony Prima to Lanthony Secunda, and all of chapters six and seven on the priorship of Roger of Norwich. He also omitted the preface and the table of contents.

In 1977, Michael Richter published a further 20 percent of the text, including the preface, the table of content, and chapters six and seven of the second book. In 2022, the full work was published in a critical edition with parallel text translation by Robert Bartlett.

== Reception and influence ==
Most of what is known about twelfth-century Llanthony comes from the History of Llanthony Priory. According to Joshua Byron Smith it is a "spirited account" of the early years of the priory that offers a "glimpse into the prejudices and local peculiarities of the community".
