= Speculum Duorum =

Work by Gerald of Wales

- The Mirror of Two Men
- Author(s): Gerald of Wales
- Language: Latin
- State of existence: Extant
- Principal manuscript(s): Biblioteca Apostolica Vaticana Reg. Lat. 470
- First printed edition: 1974
- Subject: Dispute between Gerald of Wales and his nephew over the archdeaconry of Brecon

Speculum Duorum, or The Mirror of Two Men, is a work in Latin by Gerald of Wales concerning a dispute between Gerald and his nephew over control of the archdeaconry of Brecon and its revenue. Written near the end of Gerald's life, it is unfinished and the final resolution of the dispute is unknown.

The work is divided into three parts. The first two contain a polemical treatise that began as a letter from Gerald to his nephew and the third contains eight letters addressed to other individuals, all but two bearing directly on the dispute. It provides insight into medieval writing practices and diocesan-level administration of the church, as well as into the final years of Gerald's life.

It survives in a single manuscript, Reg. Lat. 470, held in the Queen Christina collection of the Vatican Library. It was first printed in 1974 and was the last of Gerald's extant writings to be published.

== Background ==
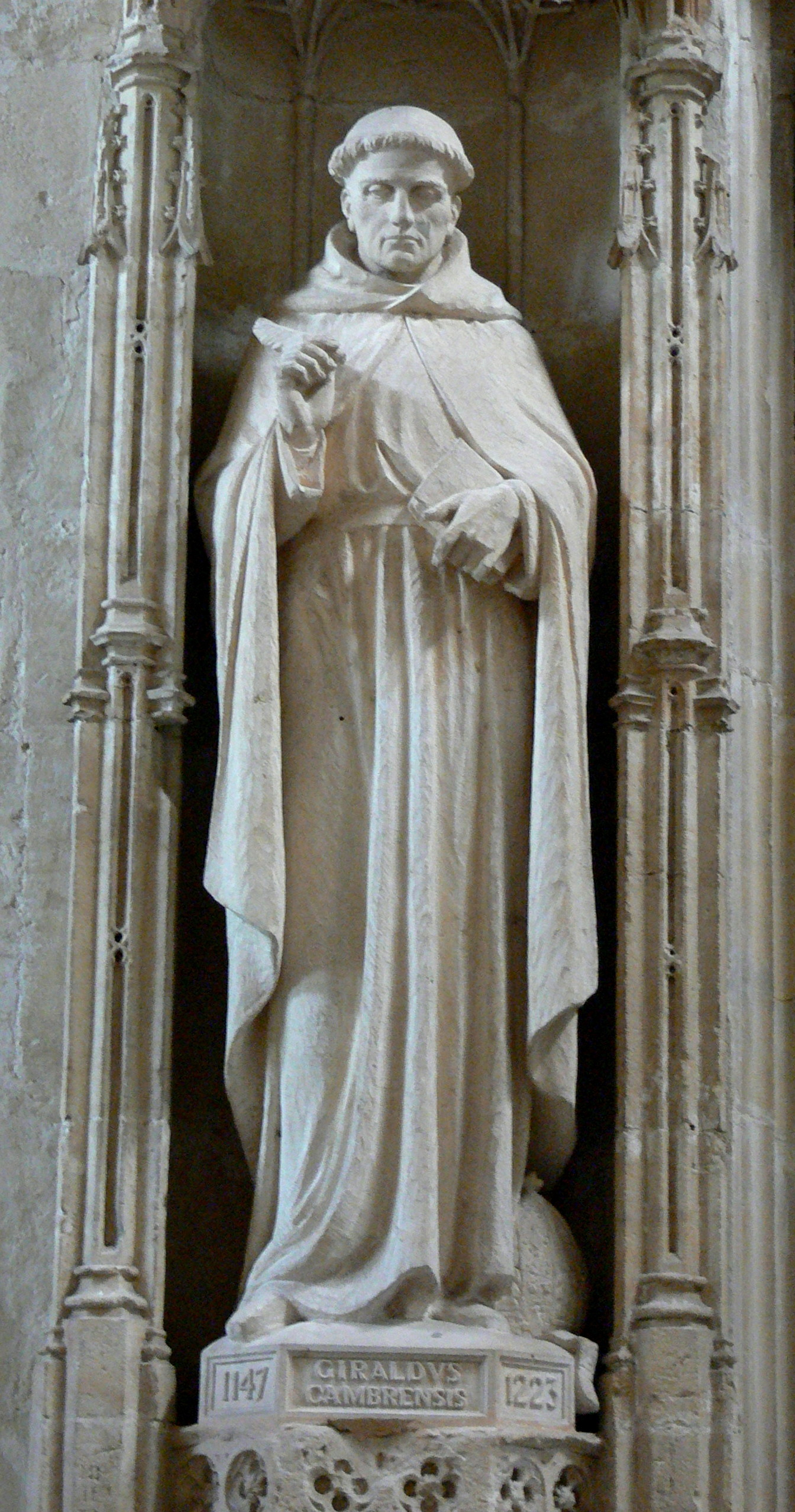
Statue of Gerald of Wales in St Davids Cathedral

=== Gerald of Wales ===
Gerald of Wales, or Gerald de Barri, was a scholar and churchman, born to a mixed Norman and Welsh family among the marcher gentry of South Wales.

In 1174 he was appointed archdeacon of Brecon by his uncle David fitzGerald, the bishop of St Davids. In 1176, he sought election to the see of St Davids after the death of his uncle, but Henry II opposed him and he was not successful.

He was unanimously elected to St Davids in 1199 over opposition from King John and Archbishop Hubert Walter, but his election was disputed and never confirmed. In 1203 Pope Innocent III declared it invalid and Gerald accepted the consecration of Geoffrey de Henlaw, an English prior, to the see.

=== Gerald de Barri, the younger ===
Gerald de Barri was a younger son of Philip de Barri and was named after his uncle Gerald of Wales. From early childhood he was brought up under his uncle's tutelage and accompanied him to Lincoln in 1196. When his uncle departed to engage in his dispute over St Davids he was left in the city to further his education, but according to his uncle he neglected his studies during this time. In 1204, when his uncle returned, he was provided with new tutors and sent to resume his studies.

=== Archdeaconry of Brecon ===
In 1204, as part of his abandonment of the dispute over the bishopric of St Davids, Gerald resigned the archdeaconry in favour of Gerald de Barri, under the condition that de Barri would be archdeacon in name only, with the income of the archdeaconry going to the elder Gerald until his death.

Gerald presents several reasons for this resignation, including resentment at the disloyalty of the canons of St David's, who had abandoned him in his bid for the bishopric, moral misgivings about how his own ecclesiastical offices had been obtained, and a promise made to his brother Philip de Barri that Philip's son would inherit Gerald's offices. Having resigned his office Gerald left England, spending time in Ireland and Rome before returning c. 1208.

De Barri came to resent this arrangement and tried to overturn it. Shortly after Gerald of Wales returned, a dispute over revenue and control of the archdeaconry emerged. The bishop of St Davids supported the younger Gerald, who took control of the archdeaconry and of a house Gerald of Wales had built for himself at Llandduw. Gerald claimed that because of this he lost an income of 50 marks per year and suffered public disgrace.

Both Gerald and de Barri appealed to Rome, but resolution was delayed by the Papal Interdict of 1208. It is not known what the final settlement in relation to the archdeaconry was.

== Composition ==
One of the last works written by Gerald of Wales, Speculum Duorum is at its core a letter, written by him to Gerald de Barri, his nephew and successor as archdeacon of Brecon. This letter was composed no earlier than the beginning of the interdict, likely c. 1208×1209, but no later than the death of Walter Map in c. 1210×1212.

Some time after the death of Pope Innocent III in 1216 this letter was copied into the manuscript, forming what is called the "primitive text". This began a process, never finished, of refining the letter into a treatise. This primitive text presents itself as unadulterated and this is partly supported by the text, which contains at the beginning and end the forms normally found in a letter and addresses the nephew in the second person. However, there are also indications that it has been revised to assume the form of a treatise and not a letter, with the text sometimes containing more information than would be required for the nephew to comprehend Gerald's meaning, and sometimes referring to the nephew in the third person.

This primitive text was then enlarged and revised through what are called the "additions". These were primarily written on separate pieces of parchment that were then added to the manuscript, demonstrating how the Speculum Duorum was transitioning from letter to treatise. They usually refer to the nephew in the third person and include anecdotes illustrating his behaviour that would not have been contained in a letter to him.

Although the additions were inserted after the primitive text was copied some were probably written earlier. One refers to Innocent III as still alive. Other additions, often quotations, were entered in the margins.

At the end of the revised letter Gerald added eight letters, all but two bearing directly on the dispute. These were likely written c. 1209 – c. 1213, with the last of them being written before the interdict was lifted in 1214.

=== Sources ===
Speculum Duorum quotes extensively from the Bible, especially Psalms, Proverbs, and Ecclesiasticus, as well as from classical authors including Virgil, Statius, Cicero, Seneca, Horace, and Ovid, and from the Church Fathers. Gerald uses these citations to frame his complaints against his nephew as arguments supported by earlier authorities.

Gerald also cites legal sources, especially the Corpus Juris Civilis and the Decretum Gratiani, but as the case rests on moral and not legal arguments these are primarily used to demonstrate that Gerald's arguments had been made by others previously.

== Summary ==
Called by Gerald "A Book of Correction and Complaint", Speculum Duorum is a polemical treatise concerned with ingratitude and with a personal controversy of Gerald's. It has been described as a "sort of a morality tale" on the risks of nepotism, and as revenge on his nephew de Barri and on his nephew's tutor, William de Capella.

The work is divided into three parts. The first two contain Gerald's letter to his nephew; the third, titled Epistularum Pars, contains letters related to the dispute and addressed to churchmen connected with the diocese of St Davids. Collectively these parts form a coherent whole, at once a personal apology, a defence, and a counterattack.

It contains much wordplay, including describing de Barri as more nepa (scorpion) than nepos (nephew) and has been described as unnecessarily long, with "mellifluous successions of ablative absolutes." Filial ingratitude is a recurring theme, and Gerald recounts cases in which younger relatives exploit older relatives for financial gain.

=== Parts One and Two ===
The revised letter is divided into two parts. It is extensive, and W. S. Davies described it as a "wearisome document, overloaded with classical, scriptural, and patristic quotations", saying that Gerald "appears not to know the difference between his nephew and a composite personality made up of the Archbishop of Canterbury, the King of England, and the Pope of Rome."

The first part gives a chronology of the relationship between Gerald and his nephew. It begins with Gerald taking the younger Gerald into his care, arranging his education, and, in Gerald's account, receiving only ingratitude in return. It charges de Barri with breaking the compromise of 1203, and with immoral conduct. Gerald treated the moral charge as the more serious one, especially as it reflected poorly on their family.

Gerald attacks his nephew's appearance, intellect, and character, describing him as ungainly, unintelligent, and diabolical. He criticised him for his Welsh speech and clothing, and for enjoying Welsh music.

The second part concerns de Barri's tutor, William de Capella, detailing his role in the affair and assigning much of the blame for the behaviour of Gerald's nephew on him and his influence. Gerald had employed de Capella and had provided him with benefices, which Gerald later argued should have secured his loyalty but did not. Gerald also accused de Capella of fraudulently obtaining the church of Llanhamlach from his father by forged documents. He also said that de Capella had received the church of Llangan from Gerald on the condition that he resign it if the younger Gerald misbehaved, a condition that de Capella did not fulfil.

Gerald also complained that de Capella had tried to prevent a reconciliation between Gerald and his nephew, fearing that reconciliation would cost him his Welsh income and influence. Gerald also objected to his efforts to discredit Gerald through his own works, by copying passages that depicted individuals unfavourably and showing them to the people described.

=== Part Three ===
The third part, titled Epistularum Pars, contains eight letters apparently inserted without major revision. Because of this they are sometimes repetitive, with the same argument restated verbatim. They show Gerald as a strong critic, sometimes justified, but always from the perspective of a man who saw himself as wronged in this controversy.

==== To Master Albinus, canon of Hereford ====
The first letter was written after 1208 to Albinus, a canon of Hereford. Gerald reminded him of his friendship with Hereford and complained that this friendship had been strained by hospitality shown to de Barri and William de Capella.

==== To Hugh de Mapenor, dean, William, precentor, and Ralph Foliot, canon of Hereford ====
The second letter was written in late 1210 or early 1211 to three members of the Hereford chapter: Hugh de Mapenor, the dean; William, the precentor; and Ralph Foliot, a canon. In it, Gerald complained that they should have known better than to support his nephew in the dispute.

==== To Master William de Montibus, chancellor of Lincoln ====
The third letter was written to William de Montibus, the chancellor of Lincoln, some time before de Montibus's death in 1213. It does not concern the Brecon dispute, but responds to de Montibus's criticism of the Expugnatio Hibernica and the Topographia Hibernica.

De Montibus argued that some passages in the works were obscene and that it would be more appropriate to write theological works. Gerald's response was that his works were of the "highest quality", and that de Montibus should either stop criticising them or return them.

==== Prologue to a sermon on St. Stephen ====
The fourth letter is a prologue to a lost sermon on Saint Stephen. It covers three folios and is undated, but was probably composed during the interdict. Michael Richter and the other editors of the 1974 edition write that it does not do credit to Gerald's "abilities in this field" or to his "clarity of thought".

==== To John, prior of Brecon ====
The fifth letter was written c. 1210×1214 to John, prior of Brecon, a friend of Gerald's who was uninvolved in the dispute, and is more moderate and balanced in its description of the dispute than the other letters. Gerald included copies of a letter sent from his nephew to him, and his response, for John to judge whether Gerald had slandered his nephew, though these are not included in Speculum Duorum.

In it, Gerald described how de Barri was unsuccessful in convincing his brother William de Barri to support him in the dispute. He also defended himself against unmade accusations that he had behaved poorly in abandoning his effort to get the support of Rome for the St Davids dispute, and predicted that the dispute over Brecon would not end until the interdict was lifted.

==== To Geoffrey, Bishop of St. David's ====
The sixth letter, written c. 1211, is a complaint to Geoffrey de Henlaw, the bishop of St Davids. It is a lengthy letter, covering nine folios,and complains of Geoffrey's bad faith in his involvement in the Brecon dispute. It also raises matters beyond Geoffrey's involvement, including the conduct of his chaplain, who had recently supported de Barri.

==== To the prior of Llanthony ====
The seventh letter was written c. 1213 to the prior of Llanthony. Like the prior of Brecon, the prior of Llanthony was uninvolved in the dispute, and Gerald sought to inform him how Geoffrey, the bishop of St Davids, was not only unsympathetic to Gerald's cause but had initiated the dispute.

Some passages in this letter are duplicates of passages in the fifth and sixth.

==== To Geoffrey, Bishop of St. David's ====
The final letter was written before the lifting of the interdict, likely in late 1213 or early 1214, and covers seven folios.

Like the sixth letter it was addressed to Geoffrey, the bishop of St Davids, but is unrelated to the Brecon dispute and instead sets out what Gerald sees as flaws and misdeeds in the conduct of the bishop. It complains of the alienation of church property, extortion of money, neglect of pastoral duties, disregard for lawful appeals, favouring simony, and allowing monks to desert their monasteries.

Gerald also complained that Geoffrey's episcopal visitations were too frequent, that they were concerned with procurations rather than episcopal duties, and that Geoffrey as bishop was taking over the functions of archdeacons. Gerald also claimed that Geoffrey neglected his flock, that he could not serve them because he did not speak Welsh, and that he acted from material motives.

== Manuscript and publication history ==
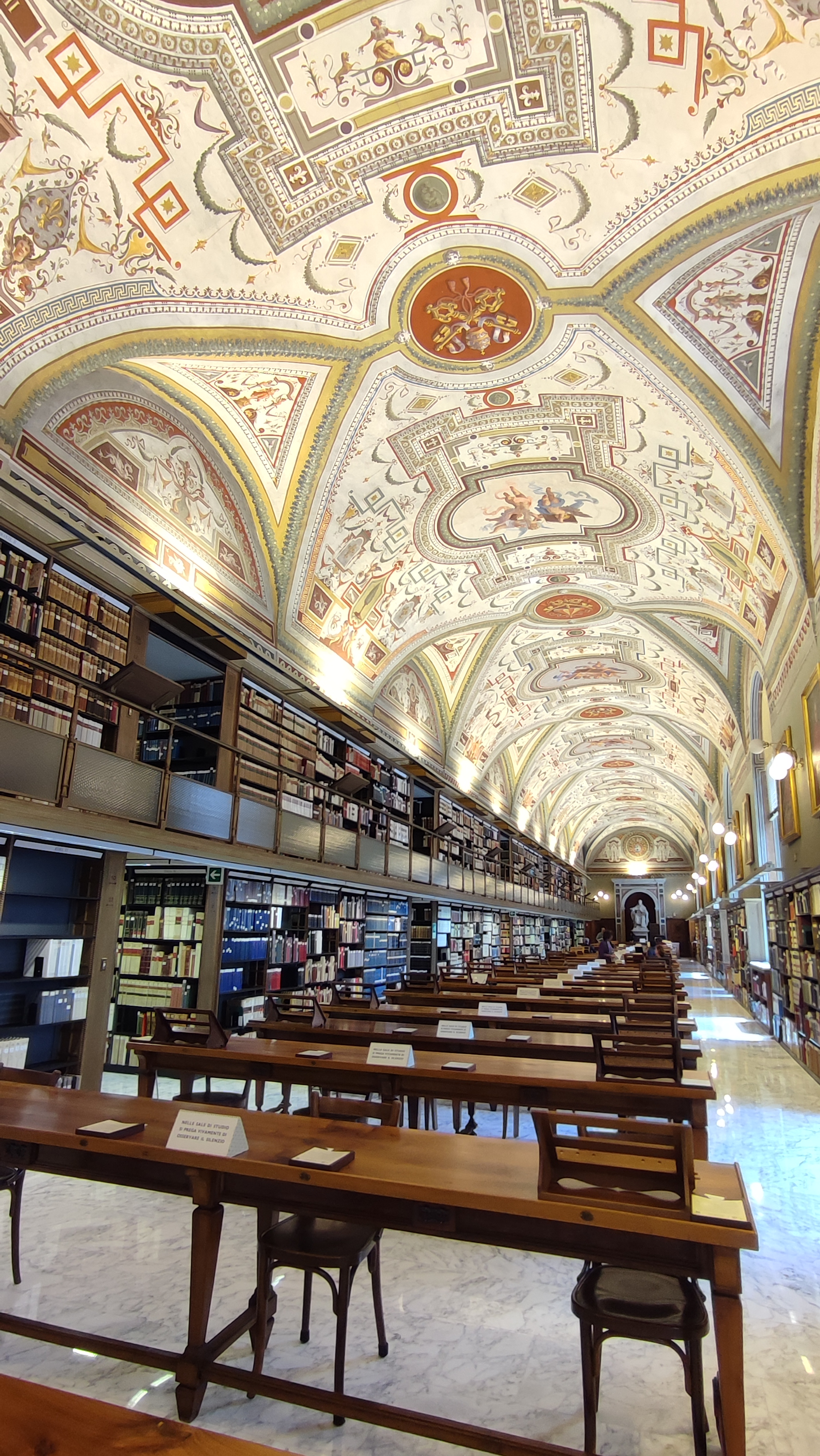
The Vatican Library, where Reg. Lat. 470 is held.

Speculum Duorum survives in a single medieval manuscript bound with De inuectionibus and held at the Biblioteca Apostolica Vaticana as Reg. Lat. 470. This may be the only manuscript of Speculum Duorum that ever existed.

Little is known about the history of Reg. Lat. 470. It was probably written in Lincoln, though there is no evidence of it there. It was later owned by Paul Petau of Orleans, who annotated several folios and whose Greek motto is written in folio 3^{r}. It then passed to Queen Christina of Sweden, and was acquired by Pope Alexander VIII with the rest of her collection in 1690. Reg. Lat. 470 is now held in the Queen Christina collection in the Vatican Library in Rome.

Neither of the works in Reg. Lat. 470 gained much attention after Gerald's death, and English historians were unaware of its existence until the middle of the nineteenth century. It was initially known only to hold De inuectionibus, but at the start of the twentieth century Thomas Matthews examined the manuscript and found that it also contained Speculum Duorum, which had been believed lost.

It is 230–233 mm in height and 162 mm in width and is bound in dark red leather. The cover was placed on the orders of Alexander VIII and is adorned with his coat of arms and, below his, the coats of arms of Queen Christina and Francesco Lorenzo Brancati di Lauria, the Vatican librarian from 1681 to 1693.

It contains 104 vellum folios divided into twelve gatherings, each typically containing eight folios made from four sheets of parchment. De inuectionibus occupies folios 1-50^{ra}. Speculum Duorum begins in the same folio, at 50^{rb}, and continues to 104^{va}. Chapter headings are written in red, and the capital letters at the start of each paragraph in Speculum Duorum are marked alternately in red and blue.

It is written in several hands, all belonging to the first quarter of the thirteenth century, and all described as "fairly good book-hands". Though not a holograph, the manuscript was close to the author and it is likely that some of the handwriting in the work is Gerald's own.

Yves Lefèvre has described it as a working copy of Gerald's, and it is the least finished of his extant writings, showing him expanding and revising the work. Unlike Gerald's complete treatises, it contains neither a preface nor a table of contents.

=== Publication history ===
Most of Gerald's works were published in the nineteenth century Rolls Series, but Speculum Duorum was first published in 1974, translated by Brian Dawson and edited by Michael Richter, Yves Lefèvre, and R. B. C Huygens. It was the last of Gerald's extant works left unpublished.

== Modern scholarship ==
It has been used for evidence of medieval writing practices in general and Gerald's in particular. Giles Constable describes it, by virtue of it being a working copy, as an "excellent case study of the revision by a mediaeval author of his own work." Yves Lefèvre similarly described the manuscript as giving uncommon evidence on the literary psychology, means of expression, and working methods of a medieval author.

W. S. Davies wrote that Speculum Duorum, together with passages in De inuectionibus, provides evidence for Gerald's life after 1204, a period for which other evidence is limited.

Richter, Dawson, and Lefèvre argue that the work provides evidence for Gerald's character, since he made the same arguments to friendly and hostile audiences. They describe this as evidence that he was an "honest man". They also state that the work provides insight into diocesan-level administration of the church, an area for which evidence is usually sparse for the period.

Robert Bartlett describes Speculum Duorum as the "sad apogee" of Gerald's late efforts to protect his "exceptional self-esteem". Richter, Dawson, and Lefèvre similarly describe Gerald as treating the dispute disproportionately to its "rather trivial cause", and write that in later life he may have been "too self-centred" to recognise this.

Philippa Byrne argues that, although Speculum Duorum is not itself a mirror for princes, it provides evidence for how writers in the Angevin Empire understood attempts to encourage Christian virtue in rulers.
