= William de Montibus =

12th to 13th century theologian and cathedral chancellor, master, and teacher

- Born: c. 1140
- Died: April 1213; Scotland

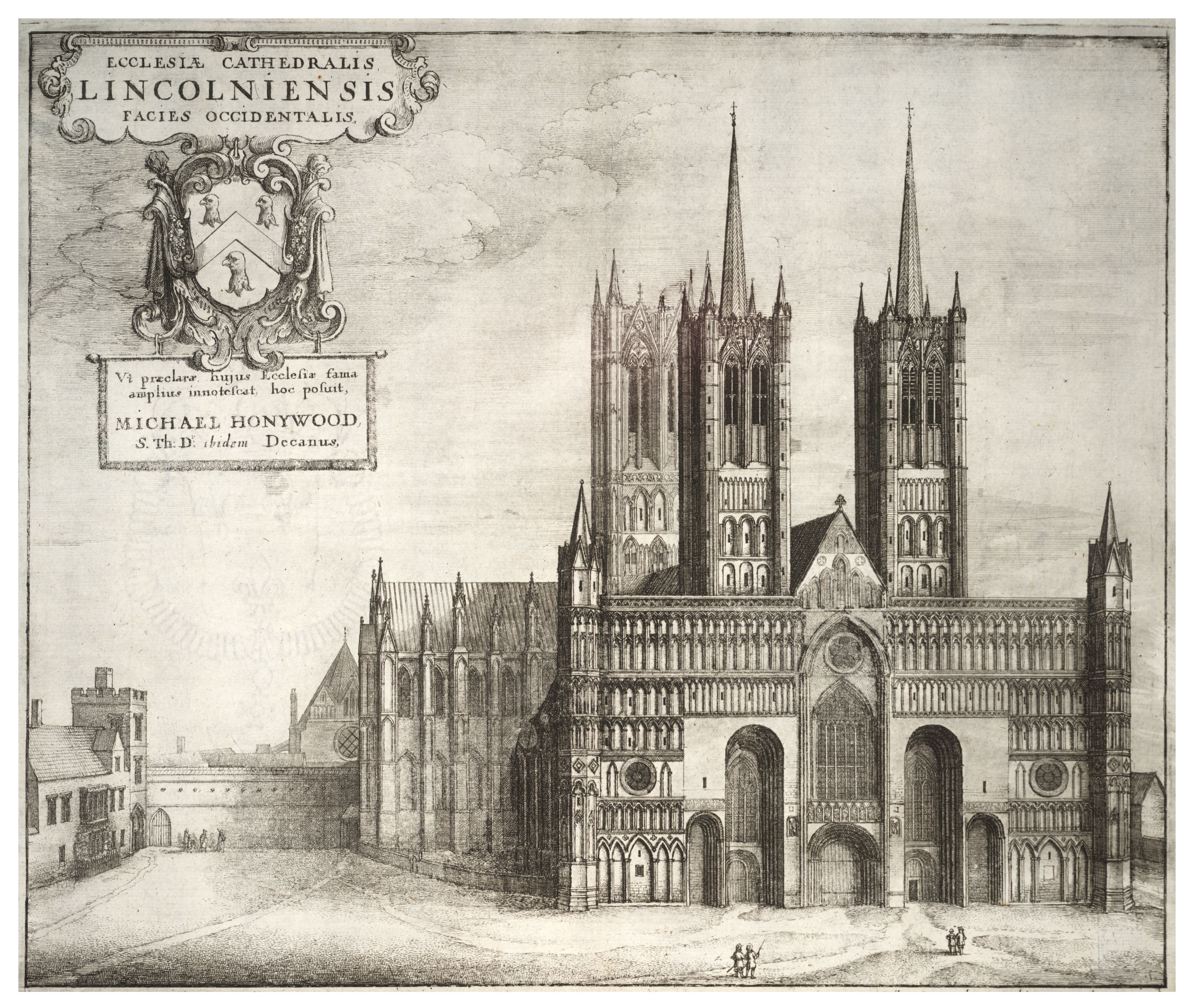
17th century print of Lincoln Cathedral with spires on the west towers

William de Montibus (or William de Monte; d. 1213) was a theologian and teacher. He travelled to Paris in the 1160s, where he was acquainted with Gerald of Wales and studied under Peter Comestor, eventually opening his own school on the Montagne Sainte-Geneviève. He was appointed by Hugh of Lincoln as master of the cathedral school in Lincoln, England in the 1180s, where his lectures drew students from around the country. He was also chancellor of the cathedral by 1194, and remained in both positions until his death in 1213. He was the instructor of Alexander Neckam in Paris, and in Lincoln taught Samuel Presbiter and Richard of Wetheringsett.

He criticised Gerald of Wales's Irish works, arguing that some passages were obscene and that it was more appropriate to write theological works. Gerald's defence is preserved in his Speculum Duorum.

== Bibliography ==
- Dunning, Andrew N.J. (2016). Samuel Presbiter: Notes from the school of William de Montibus. Toronto Medieval Latin Texts. Toronto: Pontifical Institute of Mediaeval Studies. ISBN 978-0-88844-483-7.
- Goering, Joseph W. (1992). William de Montibus (c. 1140–1213): the schools and the literature of pastoral care. Studies and texts. Toronto: Pontifical Institute of Mediaeval Studies. ISBN 0-88844-108-8.
- MacKinnon, Hugh (1968). "William de Montibus: A medieval teacher". In T.A. Sandquist; M.R. Powicke (eds.). Essays in medieval history presented to Bertie Wilkinson. Toronto: University of Toronto Press. pp. 32–45.
- van Liere, Frans (2003). "The study of canon law and the eclipse of the Lincoln schools, 1175–1225" (PDF). History of Universities. 18: 1–13. ISSN 0144-5138. Archived from the original (PDF) on 30 September 2011.
