= Peter de Leia =

Welsh monk and bishop (died 1198)

Peter de Leia, O.S.B. (died 16 July 1198), was Bishop of St David's from 1176 until his death. Before his appointment, he had been prior of the Cluniac house at Wenlock since after 1170..

De Leia was appointed by King Henry II of England as bishop, despite the preference of the cathedral chapter for Gerald de Barri, better known as Giraldus Cambrensis, and was consecrated at Canterbury on 7 November 1176. Besides his rivalry with Gerald, de Leia had a stormy relationship with Rhys ap Gruffydd, Prince of Deheubarth, whose body he initially refused burial in 1197 on the grounds that he had earlier excommunicated the prince following a dispute over stolen horses.

It was during his episcopacy that the construction of the present St David's Cathedral was begun, and it is there that the Lord Rhys was eventually buried, after the corpse had been subjected to a ritual scourging as posthumous penance for the prince's misdemeanours.

Following the death of de Leia, the chapter was again refused permission to elect Gerald de Barri, and the see remained vacant for six years.

Catholic Church titles
Preceded by David fitzGerald	Bishop of St. David's; 1176–1198	Succeeded by Geoffrey de Henlaw
