= Samuel Presbiter =

Samuel Presbiter (fl. 1200) was a theologian, a student of William de Montibus at the cathedral school in Lincoln, England.

He is the creator of several works he designates 'Collecta', preserved in two manuscripts from Bury St Edmunds Abbey, now Oxford, Bodleian Library, MS Bodley 860 and Cambridge, Pembroke College, MS 115. The common origin of these manuscripts suggests that he was also a monk at the abbey. His works typically consist of poems summarizing his learning, created for mnemonic purposes, together with prose extracts. Four of his works have been published in full or in part: his versification of Psalm 1, his records of William de Montibus's lectures on the Psalms, Collecta ex diuersis auditis in scola Willelmi de Monte (a rare record of ‘collations’ given at a cathedral school), and De oratione dominica (a versification of Hugh of St Victor's De quinque septenis).

== Bibliography ==
- Dinkova-Bruun, Greti (2009). "Samuel Presbyter and the glosses to his versification of Psalm 1: An anti-church invective?". In José Francisco Meirinhos; Olga Weijers (eds.). Florilegium mediaevale: Études offertes à Jacqueline Hamesse à l'occasion de son éméritat. Textes et études du moyen âge. Vol. 50. Louvain-la-Neuve: Fédération Internationale des Instituts d'Études Médiévales. pp. 155–174. doi:10.1484/M.TEMA-EB.4.00759. ISBN 978-2-503-53146-5.
- Dunning, Andrew N.J. (2016). Samuel Presbiter: Notes from the school of William de Montibus. Toronto Medieval Latin Texts. Toronto: Pontifical Institute of Mediaeval Studies. ISBN 978-0-88844-483-7.
- Dunning, Andrew N.J. (2016). "Hugh of St Victor's De quinque septenis (On the Five Sevens) and its versification in Samuel Presbiter's De oratione dominica (On the Lord's Prayer)". Scholarly Editing. 37.
