= Roger of Norwich =

12th-century prior of Llanthony priory

- Prior of Llanthony
- Church: Llanthony Priory
- Appointed: c. 1174
- Term ended: c. 1185×1189
- Predecessor: Clement of Llanthony
- Successor: Geoffrey de Henlaw

Personal details
- Died: 1191

Roger of Norwich (died 1191) was prior of Llanthony Priory from c. 1174 to c. 1185×1189.

== Llanthony Priory ==
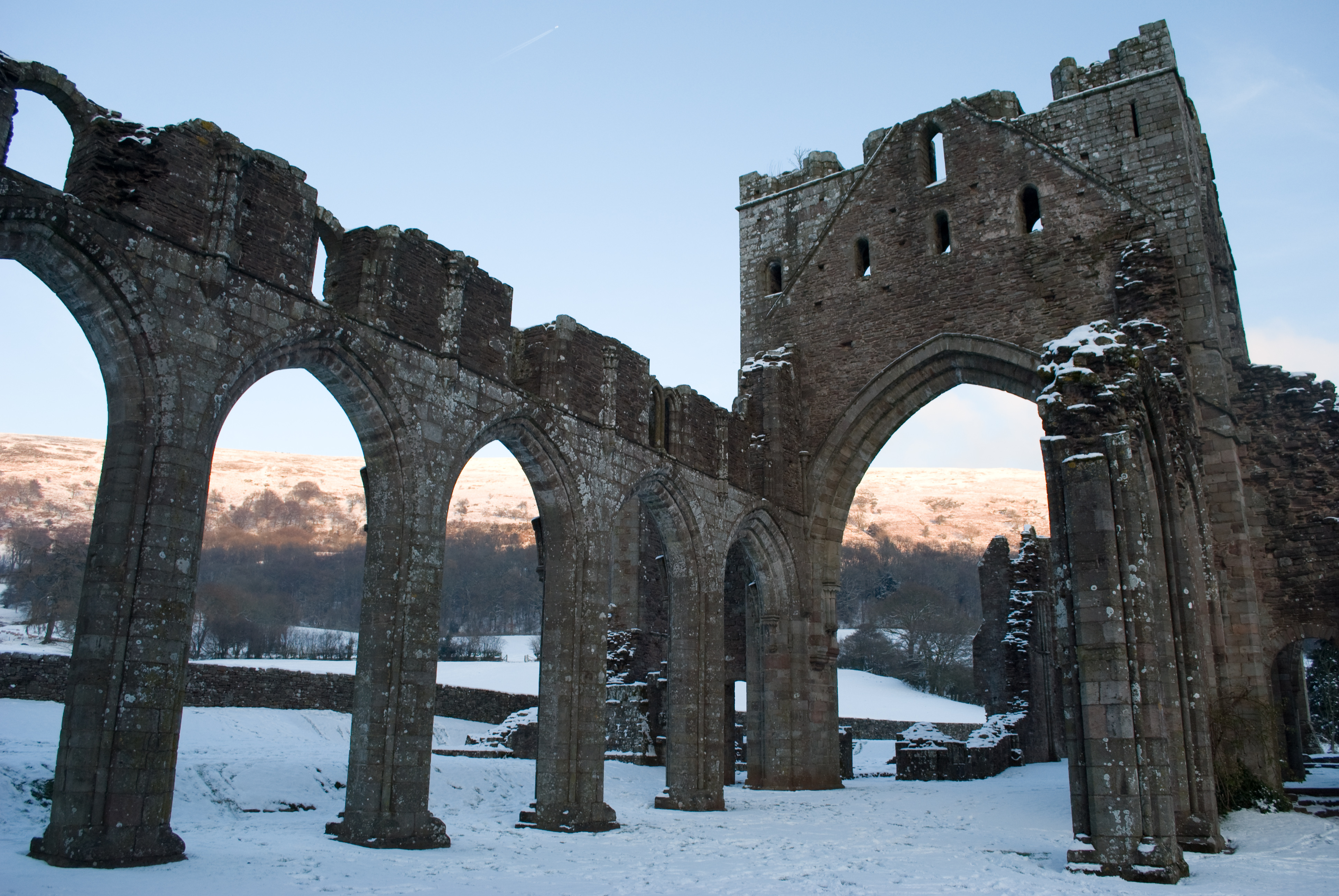
Ruins of Llanthony Priory

Roger was sub-prior under Clement of Llanthony. He succeeded him c. 1174 as the sixth prior of Llanthony Prima and the fourth prior of the daughter house, Llanthony Secunda.

Gerald of Wales described Roger as an "enemy" of the Welsh house of Llanthony Prima, accusing him of usurping revenues from it for the benefit of Llanthony Secunda in Gloucester, as well as appropriating books, ornaments, and privileges.

Roger became paralysed in old age and sought the services of Geoffrey de Henlaw, a reputed physician from Bristol, whom he rewarded with "very large gifts". The History of Llanthony Priory claimed that this paralysis was divine punishment for gluttony.

The History says that Roger nominated Geoffrey as his successor on his deathbed, while Gerald of Wales wrote that Roger resigned after falling ill, "long before his death". Geoffrey succeeded him c. 1185×1189, and according to the Annals of Winchcombe Roger died in 1191.

The Llanthony library catalogue lists a book of sermons as having belonged to Roger. Michael Richter proposed Roger as the author of part of the History of Llanthony Priory.
