= Court Farmhouse, Llanthony =

House in Llanthony, Monmouthshire, Wales

Court Farmhouse
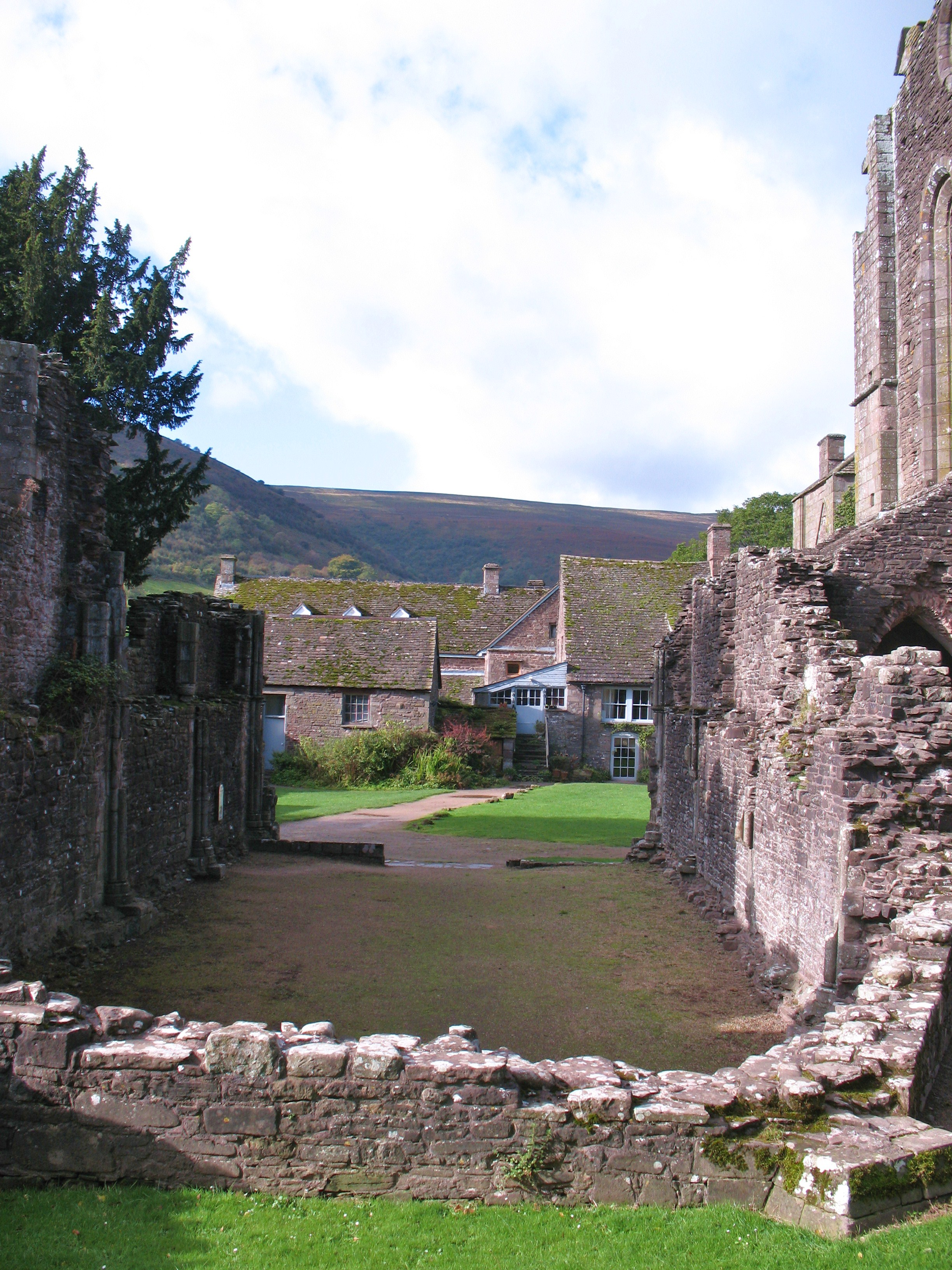
- "Important medieval origins"

- Location within Monmouthshire
- 51.9447°N 3.0369°W
- Type: House
- Location: Llanthony, Monmouthshire

History
- Built: late 15th century

Site notes
- Architectural style: Vernacular
- Governing body: Privately owned

Listed Building – Grade II*
- Official name: Court Farmhouse
- Designated: 18 August 1993
- Reference no.: 2895

Court Farmhouse, Llanthony, Monmouthshire is a farmhouse of late medieval origins. It may have originally been lodgings for the Prior of Llanthony. Following the Dissolution of the Monasteries the building became a farmhouse. In the 19th century, the Llanthony Estate was bought by Walter Savage Landor who undertook remodelling. The farmhouse is Grade II* listed, with the adjacent barn, Court Farm Barn, having a separate Grade I listing.

== History ==
The architectural historian John Newman records the traditional origins of the farmhouse as a lodging for the Prior of Llanthony. Cadw also includes this explanation in its listing description, but notes that the declining fortunes of the priory in the late-medieval period made it less likely that a new structure for this purpose would have been constructed at this time. The priory at Llanthony had been founded at the start of the 12th century but in 1136, a second foundation, Llanthony Secunda, was established at Gloucester and in the following centuries came to supersede to Welsh priory in wealth and importance. By the time of the Dissolution the priory was valued at only £100, and Court Farmhouse was remodelled as a farm building. The frontage was remodelled in the 18th century, but this was reversed by Walter Savage Landor in the mid-19th century, given the range its "entirely Victorian appearance". By the mid-20th century part of the farmhouse was being used as a cow shed. The farmhouse remains in private ownership and is now used as self-catering accommodation.

== Architecture and description ==
The farmhouse is constructed to an L-plan, with two storeys and attics. The building material is sandstone rubble, although a significant amount of medieval carved stone is included. Newman also notes the medieval origins of much of the roof structure.
