= Clement of Llanthony =

12th-century Anglo-Norman monk and theologian

- Prior of Llanthony
- Church: Llanthony Priory
- Appointed: around 1150
- Term ended: after 1167
- Predecessor: William of Wycombe
- Successor: Roger of Norwich

Personal details
- Died: after 1167

Clement of Llanthony (fl. mid-12th century) was an Anglo-Norman clergyman and theologian who became prior of Llanthony Priory. Clement became a canon at Llanthony at a young age, and was educated there. Having held the office of sub-prior, he became prior around 1150, and died sometime after 1167, although the year is not known.

Clement's theological writings were mainly derivative and contain little original thought. Mostly they are collections of commentary on the Gospels, and include a gospel harmony. All except one remain unpublished. The harmony was popular in the later Middle Ages and survives in over 40 manuscripts.

== Life ==
Clement was a native of Gloucester and became a canon of Llanthony Priory as a young child. He was a relative of Miles of Gloucester, the Earl of Hereford; (Note: Miles was buried at Llanthony.) he was perhaps a brother, but in some manner certainly a kinsman. Clement was educated at Llanthony, and his learning was praised by Gerald of Wales and Osbert de Clare. There were a number of theologians working and writing at Llanthony while Clement was being educated and while he was working and writing. He held the office of sub-prior before his election as prior around 1150. (A non-contemporary note that Clement was elected in 1150 appears to depend on a now-lost marginal note in a later work and is not considered reliable.)

Clement was the fifth prior of Llanthony and third prior of Llanthony Secunda, a dependent house of Llanthony. The two houses had the same priors from 1136 to 1205, with the prior having authority over both houses. Clement first appears as prior in a document dated 22 April 1152, and his last appearance dates to between 1167 and 1177. His time as prior was not considered exemplary, but he did institute some changes to the customs and practices of the house. Clement's cause of death is given as a paralytic stroke by Gerald of Wales in his Itinerarium Cambriae, but the year of his death is unknown.

== Works ==
Clement wrote a number of theological works, some of which still survive. Surviving works include commentaries on Acts of the Apostles and the Catholic Epistles, as well as works entitled De tribus in paenitentia consideranda and Unum ex quatuor. The work De sex alis cherubin is also ascribed to him, but some confusion exists about it. Some of the English manuscripts of the De sex ascribe it to Clement, but the work has also been associated with Alain de Lille. It is possible that Alain used Clement's work and this led to the confusion. Works that did not survive include a commentary on the Book of Revelation, a commentary on the Augustinian Rule, a work titled Summa de dialectica et theologia, and possibly a commentary on the Gospels. This work, which was seen by John Leland, may have been confused by Leland with Clement's Unum instead. Another possible work, though one unlikely to have been authored by Clement, is Meditationes de beata Virgine. Clement has also been credited with a gloss on the Psalms, which has been shown to actually be the work of Gilbert de la Porrée.

The Unum, occasionally known as Concordia Quattuor Evangelistarum, is a gospel harmony to which Clement attached a large commentary. Unum became a standard text on the Gospels in both medieval England and on the continent. It was the basis for canons compiled in the 13th century by the first William of Nottingham to serve as the Franciscan Minister Provincial of England and revised in the 14th century by the second. It was also translated into Middle English under the title Oon of Foure, and was known to have been used by the Lollards in the 14th century. Clement's works were still being copied and disseminated in the 15th century.

Most of Clement's works were derivative and did not contain much that was original thought. Instead, they comment on other works. Clement's commentary on his gospel harmony appears to have mainly compiled older writers' writings and contains little of his own thoughts on the Gospels, although it appears that he did compile the Unum directly from the four gospels and not from previous harmonies.

Most of Clement's works that survive remain unpublished. The only exception is part of Unum, which was partly published as a doctoral thesis in 1984. Most of Clement's works survive in one or two copies. Two works, De sex and Unum, have multiple copies. De sex survives in 12 manuscripts and Unum survives in at least 42 manuscripts, although in varied forms. (Note: A further copy of Unum may be at Rouen, which would make the total copies of this work 43, if the manuscript is correctly identified as Unum.) Most of the copies of Unum are in the British Isles.
