= Richard of Wetheringsett =

Chancellor of the University of Cambridge between 1215–1232

Richard of Wetheringsett (fl. 1200–1230) is the earliest known chancellor of the University of Cambridge, where he served sometime between 1215 and 1232.

Most of what is known of Richard comes from his summa Qui bene presunt, which he wrote around 1220. This shows that he was a student of William de Montibus at Lincoln Cathedral. Manuscripts of this work variously refer to him as Richard of Leicester, Richard of Wetheringsett, or Richard de Montibus, and some as the chancellor of Lincoln Cathedral. He is sometimes confused with Richard Leicester, who served as chancellor of the University of Cambridge in 1349–50. It has been speculated that he is Richard le Grant, chancellor of Lincoln Cathedral, and archbishop of Canterbury from 1229 until his premature death in 1231.
