= Geoffrey de Henlaw =

13th-century bishop of St Davids

- See: St Davids
- Elected: 1203
- Term ended: 1214
- Predecessor: Peter de Leia
- Successor: Iorwerth
- Previous post: Prior of Llanthony Priory (c. 1185×1189 to 1203)

Personal details
- Died: 1214

Geoffrey de Henlaw (died 1214) was a physician and Augustinian who served as bishop of St Davids from 1203 until his death, and as prior of Llanthony Priory from c. 1185×1189 to 1203.

== Early life ==
Geoffrey was a cleric and physician from Bristol. He is first recorded in the service of Robert Fitzharding and had probably gained a reputation as a physician before becoming an Augustinian.

== Llanthony Priory ==
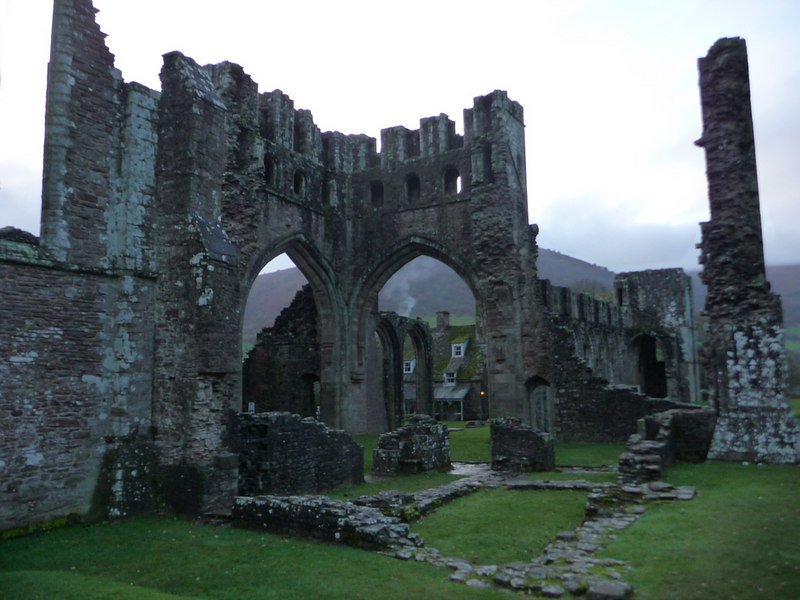
The ruins of Llanthony Priory

Geoffrey later entered the service of Roger of Norwich, prior of Llanthony Priory. Roger had sought Geoffrey's services after becoming paralysed in old age, rewarding him with "very large gifts", and nominating him as his successor on his deathbed. He succeeded Roger in c. 1185×1189, becoming the seventh prior of Llanthony Prima and the fifth prior of Lanthony Secunda.

Gerald of Wales states that Roger resigned after falling ill, while the History of Llanthony Priory has him remaining prior until his death. The first record of Geoffrey as prior is as a witness for a c. 1185×1189 grant from Maurice of Berkeley.

On 16 May 1191, Pope Celestine III addressed a papal bull to Geoffrey, placing the priory under his protection and confirming its donations, gifts, and liberties. On 26 July 1197, Richard I granted the priory a charter, which he confirmed and re-sealed on 14 November 1198. On 30 July 1199, John, King of England, granted the priory a charter confirming earlier donations, including a Gloucester schoolhouse and the church of Henlow.

The History of Llanthony Priory mentions Geoffrey's time as prior, but the surviving text breaks off before providing details.

Geoffrey gave Llanthony Priory a copy of Priscian's Grammatica (Lambeth Palace Library MS 195). It is the only book recorded as a donation from him to the priory, and its inscription indicates that it was given while he was bishop. No medical texts are known to have been donated by Geoffrey.

== Bishop of St Davids ==
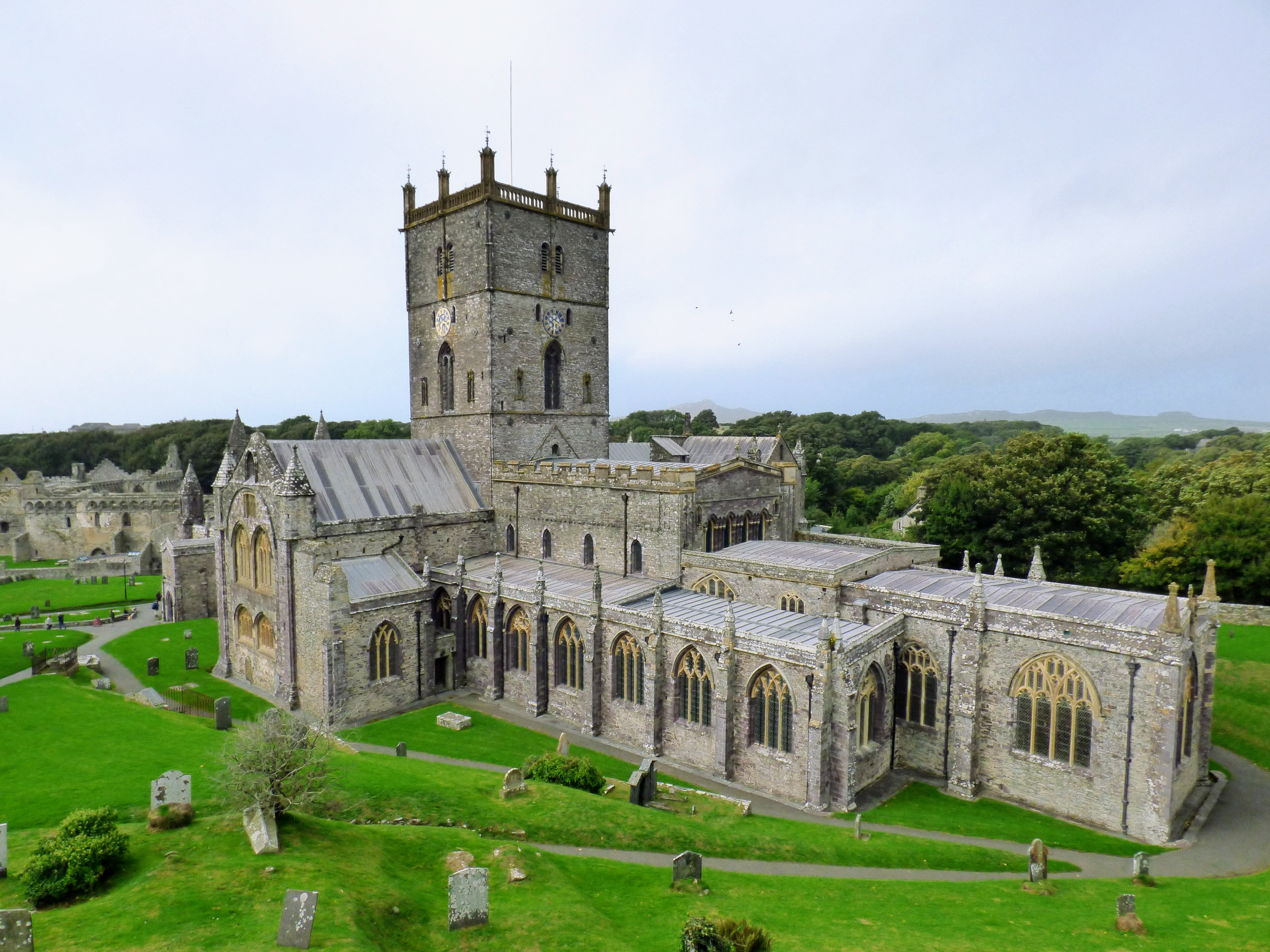
St David's Cathedral, built in the 12th century.

On 29 June 1199, the chapter of St Davids elected Gerald of Wales as bishop. With royal support, Hubert Walter, the archbishop of Canterbury, refused assent and instead offered the chapter a choice between Alexander, a Cistercian abbot, and Geoffrey. According to Gerald, Geoffrey received Walter's support because he was Walter's physician.

In 1203, Pope Innocent III declared Gerald's election invalid. At a new election held at the Palace of Westminster and supervised by Geoffrey fitz Peter, Geoffrey de Henlaw was elected bishop of St Davids with the support of King John. He then resigned as prior of Llanthony. Geoffrey was consecrated bishop at Westminster on 7 November 1203.

Compared to the priory of Llanthony, the bishopric was poor, worth 20 marks a year compared to the 500 of Llanthony, but according to Gerald of Wales it was sought for the greater rank it provided.

After his election Gerald criticised Geoffrey for, among other matters, not speaking Welsh and being unfamiliar with Welsh customs. He also claimed, in De iure et statu Menevensis ecclesiae, that Geoffrey fell into gluttony and as divine punishment became paralysed. This is a duplicate of a passage from The History of Llanthony Priory that referred to Roger of Norwich.

Brian Howells describes Geoffrey as an able administrator. As bishop, he mediated ecclesiastical disputes in the Welsh Marches, including disputes between Llanthony Prima and Lanthony Secunda, and between the Llanthony and Hereford cathedral chapters.

=== Lanthony Secunda dispute ===
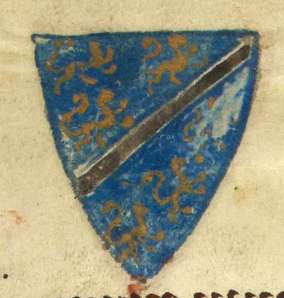
Arms of Henry de Bohun, drawn by Matthew Paris.

Lanthony Secunda was larger and more important than Llanthony Prima, but remained a cell of its motherhouse, which had suffered decades of neglect before its revival under the patronage of Hugh de Lacy, Lord of Meath. Prima may then have attempted to reassert its primacy over Secunda, whose patron, Henry de Bohun, Earl of Hereford, opposed its continued subordination and began pressing for independence in c. 1204. Gerald of Wales wrote that Geoffrey fitz Peter supported Geoffrey de Henlaw's election so that Llanthony Priory would become vacant, giving his son-in-law, Earl Henry, a freer hand in pursuing the separation.

In September 1204, in response to an appeal from Geoffrey de Henlaw to judge the status of Lanthony Secunda, Innocent III gave Geoffrey a mandate to bring the two sides together to resolve the dispute peacefully. To hear the case Innocent III appointed Gilbert Glanville, the bishop of Rochester, and the abbots of Reading and Chertsey.

Before the case was heard, the two sides negotiated with advice and counsel from the bishops of Worcester, Hereford, and St Davids. They reached a settlement, which Gilbert Glanville ratified.

== Death ==
Geoffrey died in 1214. He was succeeded as bishop of St Davids by Iorwerth on 21 June 1215.

Catholic Church titles
Preceded by Peter de Leia	Bishop of St Davids; 1203–1214	Succeeded by Iorwerth
Preceded by Roger of Norwich	Prior of Llanthony Prima; 1185×1189–1203	Succeeded by Martin
