= Church of St Michael and All Angels, Gwernesney =

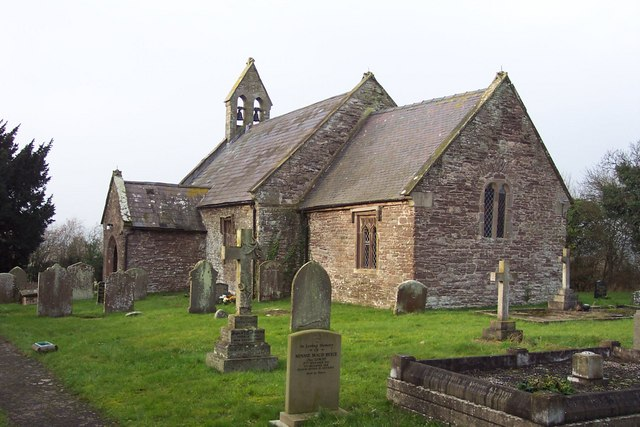
- Church of St Michael and All Angels
- Church of St Michael and All Angels, Gwernesney
- 51.7119°N 2.8483°W
- Location: Monmouth, Monmouthshire
- Country: Wales
- Denomination: Church in Wales

History
- Status: Grade I listed

Architecture
- Style: Perdendicular
- Years built: 13th/14th century

Administration
- Diocese: Monmouth

The Church of St Michael and All Angels is the former parish church of Gwernesney, Monmouthshire, Wales. It is a Grade I listed building. In 2017, the church was vested in the care of the Friends of Friendless Churches.

== History and architecture ==
The church is thirteenth century in origin but with much fifteenth-century work. The double bell gable, and more, was restored in 1853–4 by John Pollard Seddon. It is of Old Red Sandstone.

The interior contains a late medieval screen, "of particular interest." The church register of baptisms and burials dates from the year 1758 and that of marriages from 1757.
