= Court Farmhouse, Llanover =

House in Llanover, Monmouthshire, Wales

Court Farmhouse
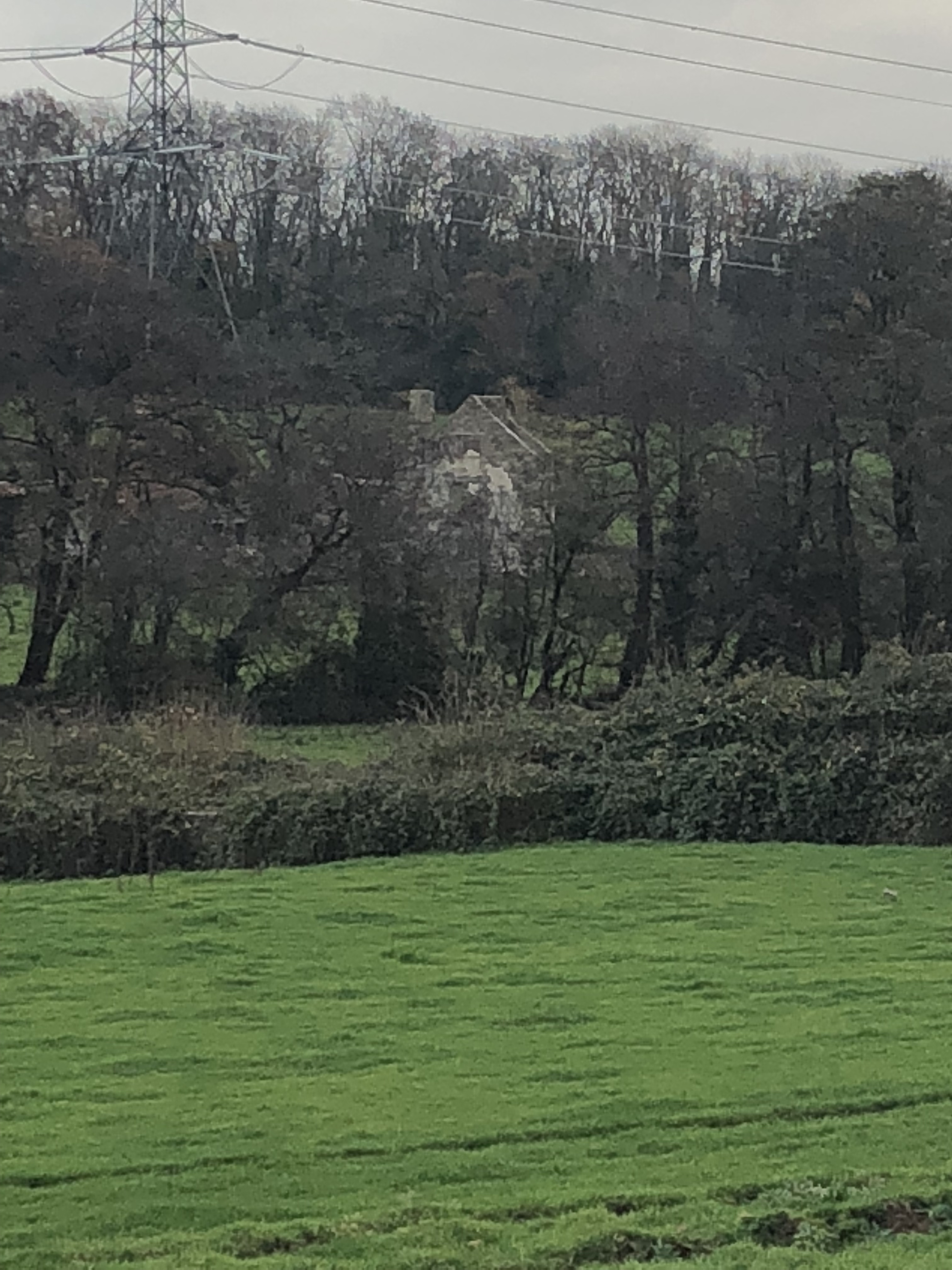
- "a fine house with early 16th century origins and well-preserved 16th and 17th century detailing"

- Location within Monmouthshire
- 51.8128°N 2.9379°W
- Type: House
- Location: Llanover, Monmouthshire

History
- Built: 16th and 17th centuries

Site notes
- Architectural style: vernacular
- Governing body: Privately owned

Listed Building – Grade II*
- Official name: Court Farm and Court Farm Cottage
- Designated: 6 May 1952
- Reference no.: 1928

Court Farmhouse and the attached Court Farm Cottage, Llanover, Monmouthshire, Wales, is a country house dating from the early 16th century. Originally two houses, which became the East and West wings of a larger house, with a connecting hall constructed in the 17th century, it is now again sub-divided. The house is a Grade II* listed building.

== History ==
The architectural historian John Newman records that the origins of the house are "two small early houses" of the 16th century which were joined by a hall-range in the 17th century. Kelly's Directory of 1901 records the farm as being in the possession of a David Robert. The farm remains a private building and is the estate office for the Llanover and Coldbrook Estate, as well as providing space for small businesses.

== Architecture and description ==
The house is of two storeys and is constructed of stone, with stone tiling roofs. John Newman notes the "splendid 17th century hall" with contemporary panelling. The Farm, and the attached cottage are a Grade II* listed building, its listing describing it as a "fine house with early 16th century origins and well-preserved 16th and 17th century detailing".
