= St David's Church, Llanthony =

St David's Church
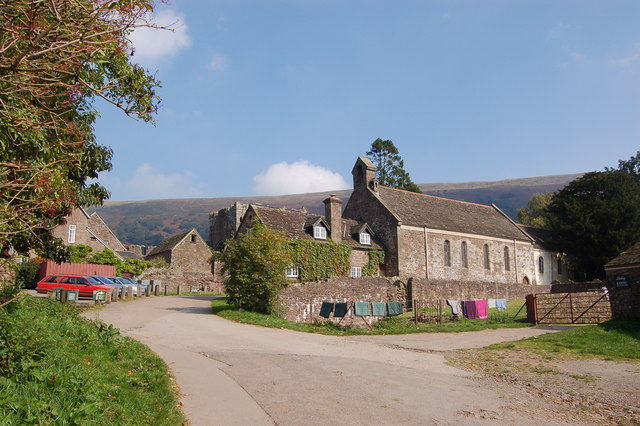
- Church of St David
- St David's Church
- 51.9439°N 3.0352°W
- Location: Llanthony, Monmouthshire
- Country: Wales
- Denomination: Church in Wales

History
- Status: Grade I listed

Administration
- Diocese: Monmouth

St David's Church is a medieval structure at Llanthony Priory. Established as a church in the sixteenth century, and restored in the late nineteenth century, the church became a Grade I-listed building on 1 September 1956.

== History and architecture ==
Standing to the south of the Priory cloister, the church was established after the Dissolution in the remains of the Priory infirmary. Much of its original medieval structure was adapted from the earlier building, its nave having originally been the main hall of the infirmary, and its chancel the infirmary's chapel. The church was restored in 1886–87, by J. James Spencer, who also undertook restoration of the Church of St Martin, Cwmyoy. Cadw notes that the church may have been established at a date earlier than the sixteenth century. A tradition suggests it was built in the twelfth century to commemorate a visit to the valley by Saint David himself. However, this tradition may instead relate to a precursor of the Priory Church.
