= Gwernesney =

Coordinates: 51°42′36″N 2°50′53″W

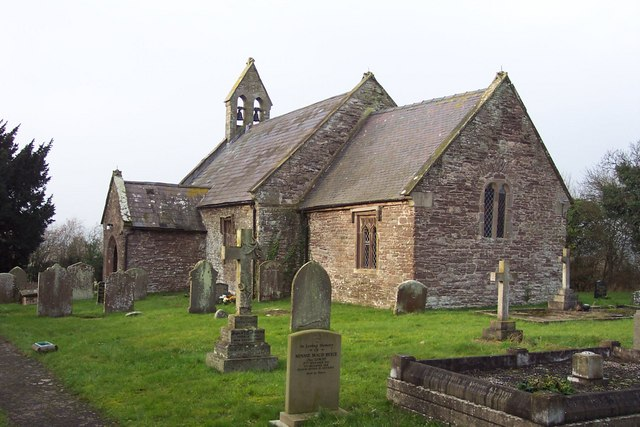
Church of St Michael and All Angels

Gwernesney (Welsh: Gwernesni) is a village in Monmouthshire in southeast Wales.

== Location ==
Gwernesney is located 3 miles (4.8 km) east of Usk on the B4235 road to Chepstow.

== History and amenities ==
Gwernesney is set in a rural location close to Usk town. The former parish church in the village is St Michael and All Angels. The South Wales Gliding Club operate towed gliders from nearby.
