= Abbey Hotel, Llanthony Priory =

Hotel in Monmouthshire, Wales

Coordinates: 51.9448°N 3.0368°W

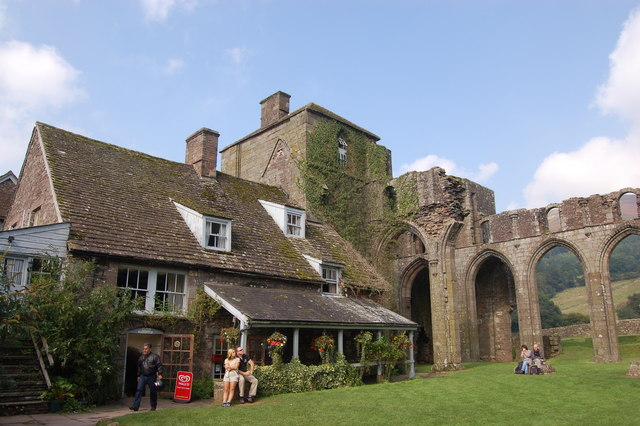
Abbey Hotel

Abbey Hotel (also known as the Llanthony Priory Hotel) is a Grade I listed building incorporating a hotel and country inn in Llanthony, Monmouthshire, Wales.

== Location and history ==
The Abbey Hotel is located next to the ruins of Llanthony Priory and actually incorporates the south-west tower of the monastic building. The remainder of the building may have originally been the lodgings for the prior. The surrounding Augustinian priory originated around 1100, and the presently existing church, chapter house and cloisters were built between 1180 and 1220. After being dissolved in 1538, the priory fell into disrepair. The building that is now the hotel was remodelled in the early 19th century, probably by the poet Walter Savage Landor, who bought the abbey in 1803 and lived on the site for a short period. The four-storey south-west tower of the priory was a direct adaptation of the original 13th-century structure.

The hotel was given Grade I listing status in 1956.

== Hotel and inn ==
The hotel comprises only five bedrooms, one of them being at the top of the tower and reached by 62 narrow steps. In 2001 all five bedrooms shared one bathroom, located in the tower. A pub and dining room is on the ground floor serving drinks and meals. The bar is located in a vaulted 13th-century undercroft. There is a large covered veranda for public use.
