= Court Farm Barn, Llanthony Priory =

Barn in Llanthony, Monmouthshire, Wales

Court Farm Barn
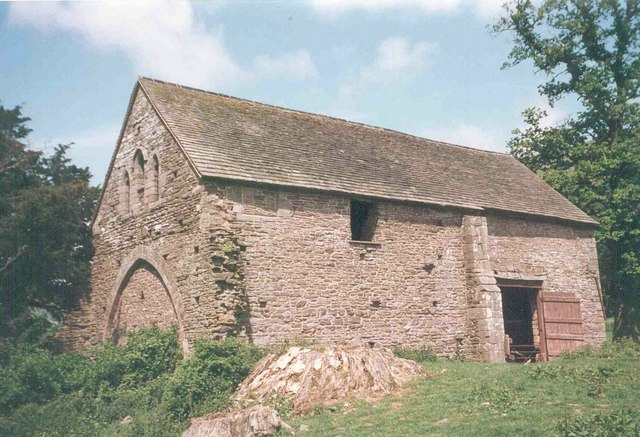

- Location within Monmouthshire
- 51.9447°N 3.0387°W
- Type: Barn
- Location: Llanthony, Monmouthshire

History
- Built: C.12th century onwards

Site notes
- Governing body: CADW

Listed Building – Grade I
- Official name: Barn at Court Farm with the attached precinct wall
- Designated: 9 January 1956
- Reference no.: 1941

Court Farm Barn, Llanthony Priory, Monmouthshire, is a barn of late medieval origins that forms part of a group of historic buildings in the priory complex. It is a Grade I listed building.

== History ==
The original barn was constructed as the gatehouse to Llanthony Priory. It is of 12th-century origins. Following the Dissolution of the Monasteries in the mid-16th century, the building was converted to secular use as a barn. Subsequently, it fell into ruin. In the 19th century the Llanthony estate was purchased by the poet Walter Savage Landor and it is possible that he undertook some reconstruction. The Royal Commission on the Ancient and Historical Monuments of Wales Coflein database records a second period of reconstruction in the 19th century but does not attribute this to Landor.

== Architecture and description ==
The barn is constructed of Old Red Sandstone rubble with a tiled roof. The interior has "a much earlier look" than the exterior, and may comprise more of the original 12th-century work. The architectural historian John Newman describes the building as having been "extended and brutally adapted after the Dissolution." One gable end has "a full-width arch...and above it a handsome group of three lancets." It also has two notable cusped windows, dating from the 14th century.
