= William of Wycombe =

12th-century English writer

William of Wycombe (died after 1148) was an English cleric and biographer who became head of the Augustinian priory of Llanthony and wrote a eulogistic life of his friend and patron Robert de Bethune.

== Life ==
Probably born in Buckinghamshire, from an early age William knew Robert de Béthune. By 1127 he was acting as chaplain to Robert, then prior of Llanthony, and himself became a canon of that house. When Robert became Bishop of Hereford in 1131, he was often in his company.

In 1137 William became prior of Llanthony in its new premises at Gloucester. Allegedly displeased over his strict discipline, the canons deposed him in around 1150, but their action was almost certainly due to pressure from their lay patron Roger FitzMiles, Earl of Hereford, who was angry over things William had written about his father Miles.

William retired to a cell of Llanthony at Frome and wrote his surviving work Vita Domini Roberti de Betune Herefordiensis Episcopi (The Life of Lord Robert of Béthune, Bishop of Hereford), which exists in two versions. A hagiography, it presents Robert as an ideal canon, prior and bishop but did not secure his sainthood.
