= Llanthony Priory =

Grade I listed priory in Wales

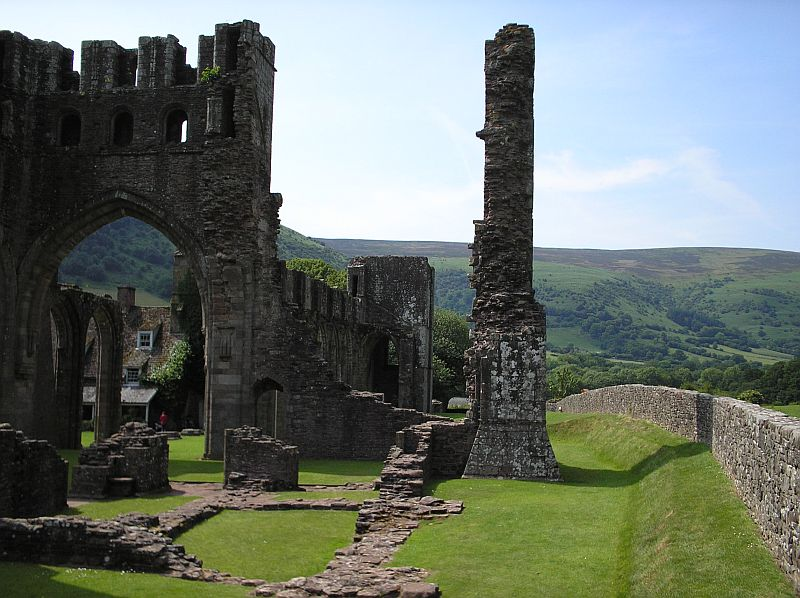

- Location within Wales
- 51°56′40″N 3°02′16″W
- Location: Llanthony, Monmouthshire, Wales

Site notes
- Governing body: Cadw

Llanthony Priory (Welsh: Priordy Llanddewi Nant Hodni) is a partly ruined former Augustinian priory in the secluded Vale of Ewyas, a steep-sided once-glaciated valley within the Black Mountains area of the Brecon Beacons National Park in Monmouthshire, south east Wales. It lies seven miles north of Abergavenny on an old road to Hay-on-Wye at Llanthony. The priory ruins lie to the west of the prominent Hatterrall Ridge, a limb of the Black Mountains. The main ruins are under the care of Cadw and entrance is free.

The priory is a Grade I listed building as of 1 September 1956. Within the precincts of the Priory are three other buildings with Grade I listed status: the Abbey Hotel, listed on 1 September 1956; St David's Church, listed on the same date, and Court Farm Barn, listed on 9 January in the same year.

== History ==
=== Foundation ===
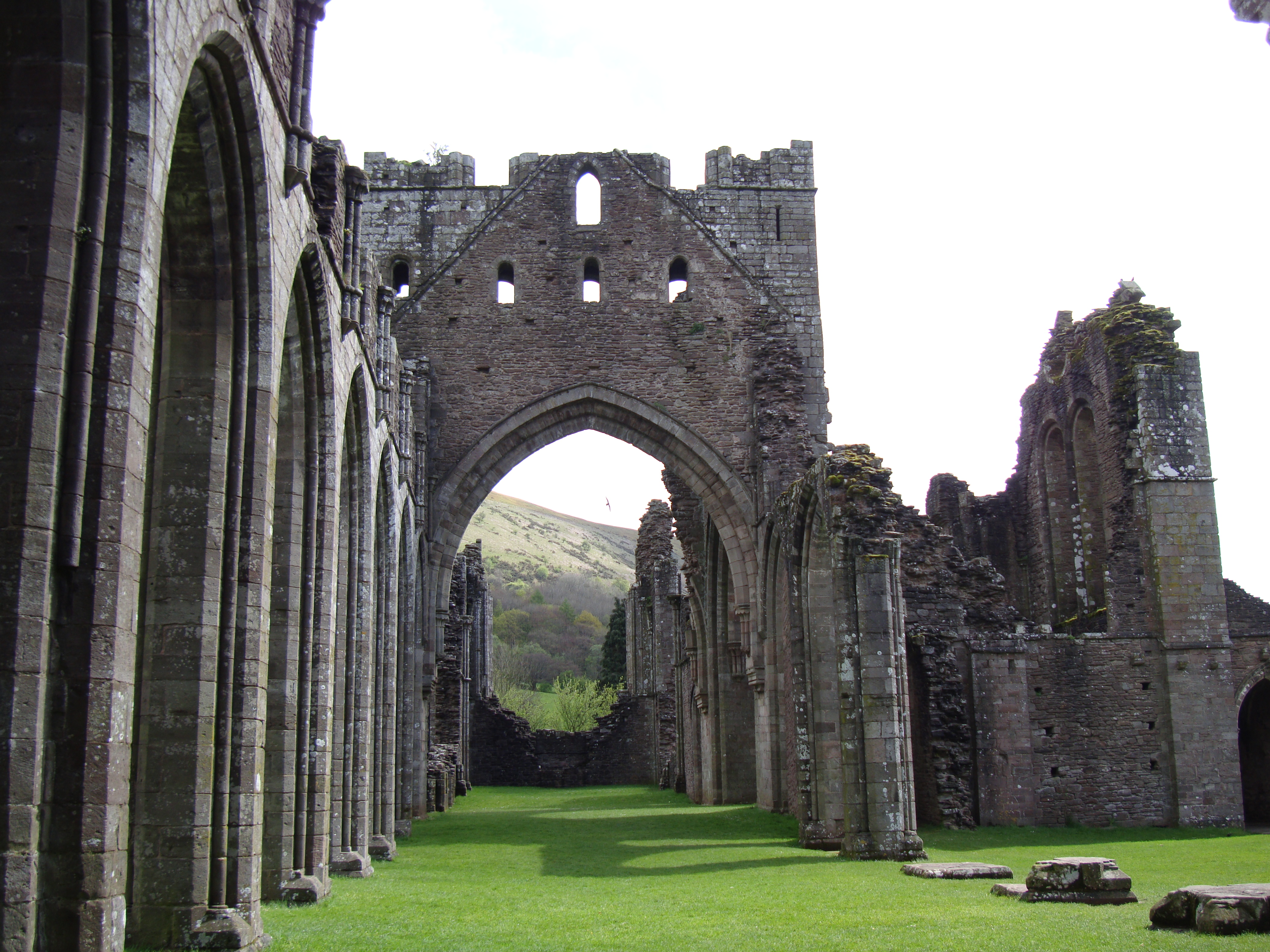
Llanthony Priory's tower and nave

The priory dates back to around the year 1100, when one of Hugh de Lacy's knights called William reputedly came upon a ruined chapel of St. David at this location; he was inspired to devote himself to solitary prayer and study. He was joined by Ersinius, a former chaplain to Queen Matilda, the wife of King Henry I, and then by a band of followers. A church was built on the site, dedicated to St John the Baptist, and consecrated in 1108. By 1118, a group of around 40 canons had founded there a priory of Canons Regular, the first in Wales.

In 1135, after persistent attacks by the local Welsh population, the monks retreated to Gloucester, where they founded a secondary cell, Llanthony Secunda. However, around 1186 another member of the de Lacy family, Hugh, the fifth baron, endowed the estate with funds from his Irish estates to rebuild the priory church, and this work was completed by 1217. There are also letters from Pope Clement III (CSM, i, p. 157–159), between 1185 and 1188, confirming further grants and gifts to the priory from Adam de Feypo and Geoffrey de Cusack in Ireland.

The Priory became one of the great medieval buildings in Wales, in a mixture of Norman and Gothic architectural styles. There was further building around 1325, with a new gatehouse. On 4 April 1327 (Palm Sunday), the deposed Edward II stayed at the Priory on his way from Kenilworth Castle to Berkeley Castle, where he is alleged to have been murdered.

=== Description by Giraldus Cambrensis ===
In March 1188, during his journey around Wales accompanying the Archbishop of Canterbury Baldwin of Forde (who was raising money and volunteers for the Third Crusade), Giraldus Cambrensis (Gerald of Wales) visited the priory and later wrote a description in Latin, part of which reads as follows:

"In the deep vale of Ewyas, which is not more than three bowshots wide, stands, encircled with an amphitheatre of immense mountains, the church of St. John; it is covered with lead, and not inelegantly built, with an arched roof of stone. This spot is justly suited for religious exercises, and most proper for canonical discipline of any other monastery in the British island.

"The church was first founded, solitary and remote from all worldly noise, by two hermits, to the honour of a monastic life, and is situated on the river Hodney, which runs through the length of the vale.

"The cloistered monks may view, from within their walls, the mountains rising above them and almost touching heaven with their exalted summits, and abounding with deer feeding aloft, at the extremity of the lofty horizon.

"The sun is never visible to this gloomy recess, till between the afternoon hours of one and three; and even then, is rarely seen, except in the clearest season." (translated by Henry Wyndham (1781))

A work titled The History of Llanthony Priory was later issued anonymously, possibly written by Giraldus.

=== Dissolution ===
Following Owain Glyndŵr's rebellion in the early 15th century, the Priory seems to have been barely functioning. In 1481, it was formally merged with its daughter cell in Gloucester, but after 1538, both houses were suppressed in Henry VIII's dissolution of the monasteries.

=== The 18th and 19th centuries ===
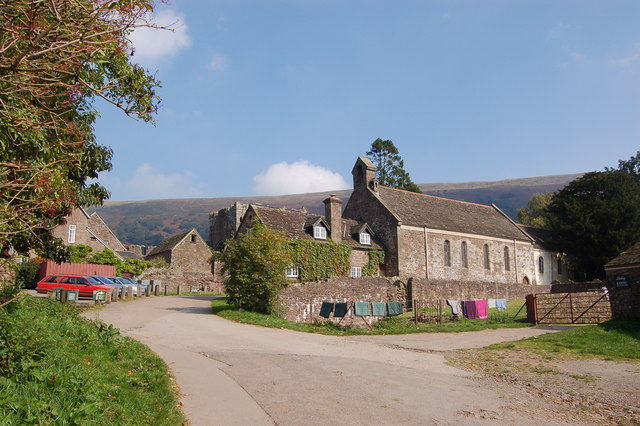
The Church of St David

The buildings at Llanthony gradually decayed after the Dissolution to a ruin, although in the early 18th century the medieval infirmary was converted to the Church of St David. In 1799, Colonel Sir Mark Wood, the owner of Piercefield House near Chepstow, bought the estate and converted some of the buildings into a domestic house and shooting box. He then sold the estate in 1807 to the poet Walter Savage Landor.

Landor needed an Act of Parliament, passed in 1809, to be allowed to pull down some of Wood's buildings and construct a house, which was never finished. He wanted to become a model country gentleman, planting trees, importing sheep from Spain and improving the roads. There is still an avenue of trees in the area known as Landor's Larches and many old chestnuts have been dated back to his time.

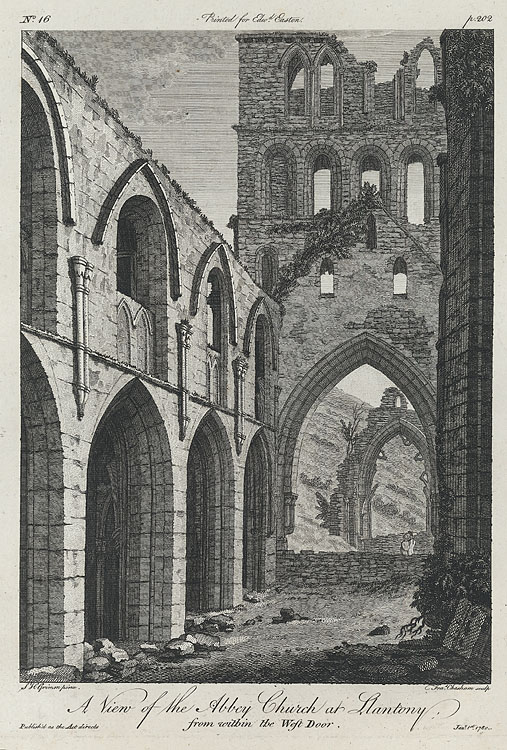
A 1780 engraving of Llanthony Abbey, viewed from the West door

Landor described the idylls of country life, including the nightingales and glow-worms in the valley, to his friend Robert Southey. However, the idyll did not last long, as for the next three years Landor was worried by the combined vexation of neighbours and tenants, lawyers and lords-lieutenant and even the Bishop of St David's. Many of his troubles stemmed from petty squabbles, arising from his headstrong and impetuous nature. He wasted money trying to improve the land and the condition of the poorer inhabitants. The final straw was when he let his farmland to one Charles Betham, whom Landor viewed as incompetent and extravagant and who paid no rent. After an expensive action to recover the debts from Betham, Landor had had enough and decided to leave the country, abandoning Llanthony to his creditors – principally his mother. The estate was administered in his absence by his mother and cousin, but many of the buildings continued to disintegrate thereafter.

In 1869, Joseph Leycester Lyne (known as Father Ignatius) founded an Anglican monastic institution at nearby Capel-y-ffin, which he named Llanthony Abbey. It survived until 1908 and its buildings were later the home of artist Eric Gill.

=== Later history ===
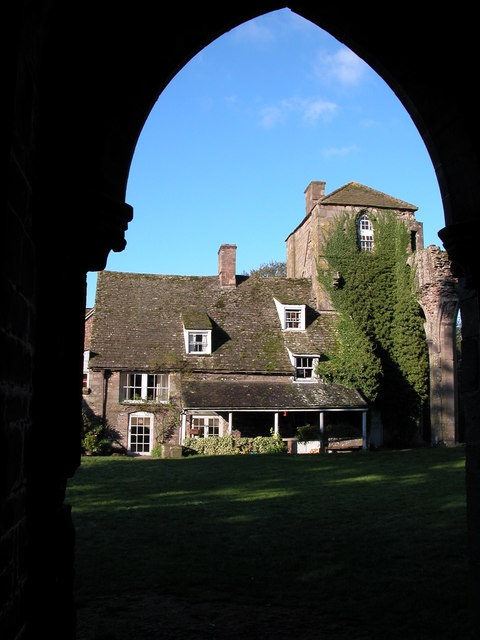
The Abbey Hotel

The ruins have attracted artists over the years, including J. M. W. Turner who painted them from the opposite hillside. The priory was acquired by the Knight family in the 20th century.

Wood's house later became the Abbey Hotel. The remaining ruins are protected by Cadw and entrance to the ruins is free of charge to visitors.

== See also ==
- Prior of Llanthony Prima
- List of monastic houses in Wales
- William of Wycombe

== Sources ==
- Gerald of Wales (1978). The Journey Through Wales/The Description of Wales. Translated by Thorpe, Lewis. UK: Penguin Books.
- J. Newman (2000) The Buildings of Wales – Gwent / Monmouthshire (ISBN 0-14-071053-1)
