= List of manuscripts of works of Gerald of Wales =

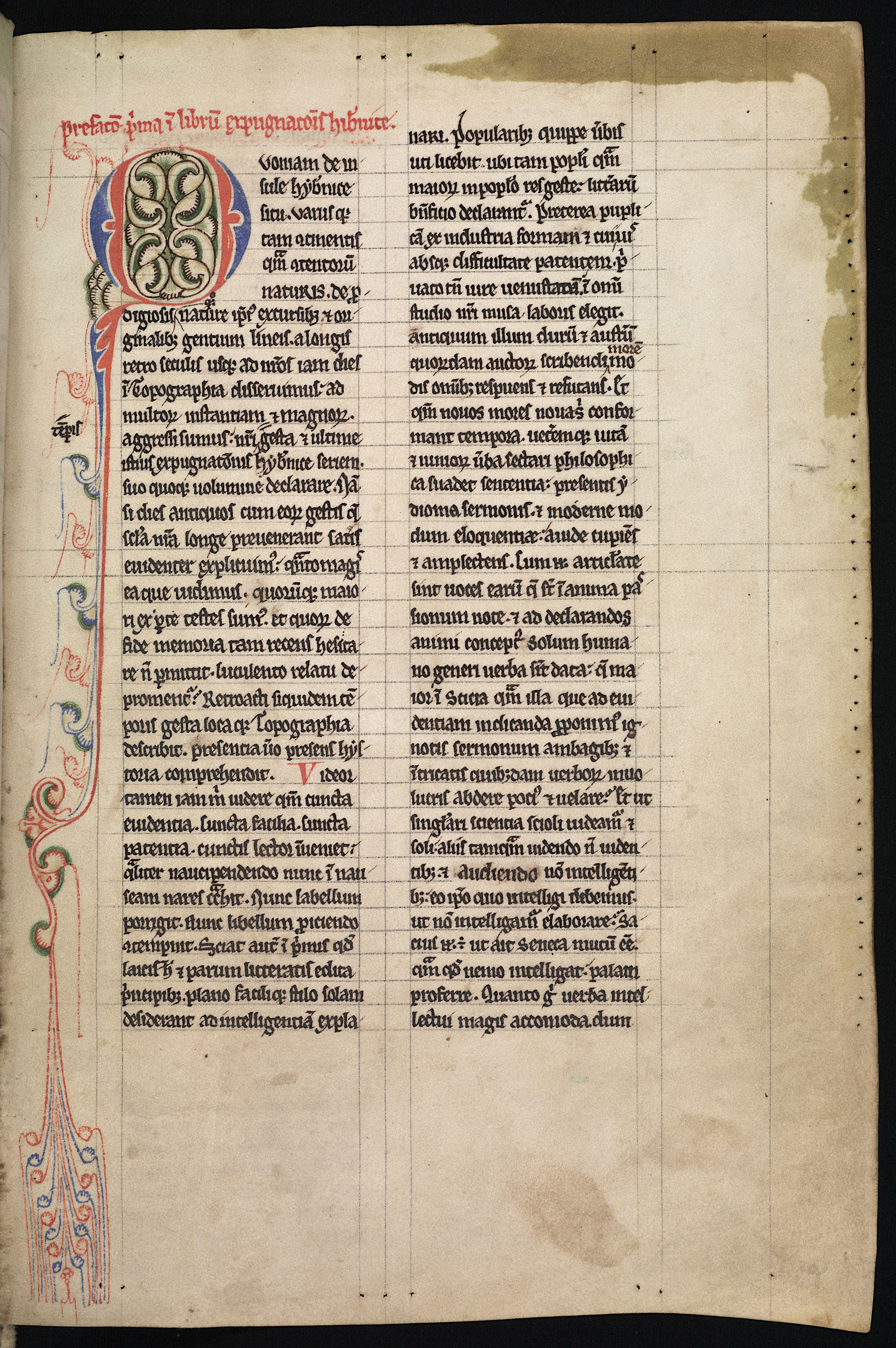
Opening page of Gerald of Wales's Expugnatio Hibernica

Gerald of Wales (c. 1146 – c. 1223) wrote approximately twenty-three works in Latin, nineteen of which survive in 111 known manuscripts. His works on Ireland and Wales are the best represented. The manuscripts range from the late twelfth century to the early modern period and include translations into English, Irish, and Provençal.

== Background ==
Gerald of Wales (c. 1146 – c. 1223) was a scholar and churchman, born to a mixed Norman and Welsh family among the marcher gentry of South Wales. During his lifetime he authored around twenty-three works, many of which survive.

== Manuscripts ==
Gerald of Wales's works survive in 111 known manuscripts. Together, these manuscripts preserve 181 complete or partial copies of nineteen works, along with letters and poems. Gerald's works on Ireland and Wales are the best represented, while his hagiographies survive in only one or two manuscripts. Three works, the Mappa Kambriae, De Fidei Fructu Fideique Defectu, and De Philosophicis Flosculis, are not known to have any surviving copies.

Although Gerald desired his works be translated from Latin into the vernacular, no translations are known before the fifteenth century. Twenty-five surviving copies are translations, covering eight works. Most are in English, while two are in Irish and one in Provençal.

Work	Surviving copies	Surviving translations
Topographia Hibernica	49	3 (1 in Provençal)
Expugnatio Hibernica	38	12 (2 in Irish)
Itinerarium Kambriae	17	2
Descriptio Kambriae	24	3
Vita Sancti Dauidis	2	
Vita Galfridi archiepiscopus eboracensis	1	
Vita Sancti Ethelberti	2	
Vita Sancti Hugonis	1	
Vita Sancti Remigii	1	
Gemma ecclesiastica	2	
Symbolum electorum	5	
De rebus a se gestis	4	
De iure et statu meneuensis ecclesiae	7	2
De inuectionibus	5	1
De principis instructione	5	
Speculum duorum	1	
Catalogus breuior librorum suorum	6	1
Retractationes	7	1
Speculum Ecclesiae	4	

Most of the manuscripts are medieval. The earliest date from the late twelfth century and approximately a fifth date from within Gerald's lifetime. They are mostly written in one of four script types: Protogothic minuscule, Textualis, Cursiva, and Early modern Secretary and Italic.

Their physical properties vary among the 101 categorised by Catherine Rooney. In size, the tallest is 300mm, while the widest are 200mm. The smallest is BL Add. 34762, at 90 by 65mm. Most are written in two columns, though some are written in one; Bodleian Auctarium D.2.9 uses three for Gerald's works. Of the parchment manuscripts, most are constructed with quires of eight or twelve leaves, although three use quires of ten.

=== Cataloguing history ===
Forty-one of the manuscripts were known to the editors of the 19th century Rolls Series, which published many of Gerald's works. Robert Bartlett listed 71 in his 1982 Gerald of Wales, 1146–1223, and Richard Sharpe listed 48 in his 1997 Handlist,

In 2005 Rooney identified 26 unlisted by either Bartlett or Sharpe, bringing the total to 101. Ten further manuscripts have since been identified. An additional manuscript, Cotton Vitellius E.viii, containing a copy of Vita Sancti Dauidis, was destroyed in the 1731 Ashburnham House fire, though its text survives in the Anglia Sacra.

== List ==
Holding	Manuscript	Language	Contents	Date
Aberystwyth, National Library of Wales	3024C	Latin	Itinerarium Kambriae and Descriptio Kambriae	Late 13th century
Aberystwyth, National Library of Wales	3074D	Latin	Topographia Hibernica and Expugnatio Hibernica	14th century
Aberystwyth, National Library of Wales	Peniarth 383D	Latin	Itinerarium Kambriae and Descriptio Kambriae	Late 15th to early 16th century
Aberystwyth, National Library of Wales	MS 110B	English	Extracts from Topographia Hibernica and Descriptio Kambriae	18th century
Cambridge, Corpus Christi College	390	Latin	Vita Galfridi archiepiscopus eboracensis	Early 13th century
Cambridge, Corpus Christi College	400	Latin	Part B: Topographia Hibernica	Late 12th century to early 13th century
Cambridge, Corpus Christi College	400	Latin	Part C: Descriptio Kambriae, extracts from De inuectionibus, Retractiones and Catalogus breuior librorum suorum	Late 16th century
Cambridge, Corpus Christi College	400	Latin	Part D: De iure et status meneuensis ecclesiae and assorted poems	Early 13th century
Cambridge, Corpus Christi College	425	Latin	Vita Sancti Remigii and Vita Sancti Hugonis	Early 13th century
Cambridge, Emmanuel College	1.1.3	Latin	Topographia Hibernica	1481
Cambridge, Gonville and Caius College	290/682	Latin	Extracts from Topographia Hibernica, Expugnatio Hibernica and Speculum Ecclesiae	Mid to late 14th century
Cambridge, Peterhouse	177	Latin	Topographia Hibernica	15th century
Cambridge, St Catharine's College	3	Latin	Topographia Hibernica	Mid 13th century
Cambridge, Trinity College	B.11.16	Latin	Vita Sancti Ethelberti	15th century
Cambridge, Trinity College	O.5.24	Latin	Descriptio Kambriae, Retractationes and Catalogus breuior librorum suorum	Late 16th to early 17th century
Cambridge, Trinity College	O.10.16	Latin	Symbolum electorum	17th century
Cambridge, Trinity College	R.7.11	Latin	Symbolum electorum	Late 12th century
Cambridge, University Library	Add. 3392	Latin	Abridged Expugnatio Hibernica	Late 13th century to early 14th century
Cambridge, University Library	Ff.1.27	Latin	Topographia Hibernica, Expugnatio Hibernica and Itinerarium Kambriae	Late 13th century to early 14th century
Cambridge, Corpus Christi College	66A	Latin	Descriptio Kambriae and Retractationes	Late 16th century
Cambridge, University Library	Mm.2.18	Latin	Extracts from Topographia Hibernica	14th century
Cambridge, University Library	Mm.5.30	Latin	Topographia Hibernica	Late 12th century
Douai, Bibliotheque municipale	887	Latin	Topographia Hibernica and Expugnatio Hibernica	Late 12th century to early 13th century
Dublin, Farmleigh House, Benjamin Iveagh Library	IV E 6	Latin	Topographia Hibernica	Late 12th century to early 13th century
Dublin, National Library of Ireland	700	Latin	Topographia Hibernica and Expugnatio Hibernica	Early 13th century
Dublin, National Library of Ireland	1416	English	Abridged Expugnatio Hibernica	1575
Dublin, Trinity College	515	Latin	Extracts from De inuectionibus	Late 13th century to early 14th century
Dublin, Trinity College	574	Latin	Extracts from Topographia Hibernica, Expugnatio Hibernica, Itinerarium Kambriae and Descriptio Kambriae	Late 16th century to early 17th century
Dublin, Trinity College	592	Middle English	Abridged translation of Expugnatio Hibernica	15th century
Dublin, Trinity College	593	Middle English	Abridged translation of Expugnatio Hibernica	Late 16th century to early 17th century
Dublin, Trinity College	1298	Irish	Extracts of Expugnatio Hibernica	15th century
Dublin, Trinity College	11500	Latin	Expugnatio Hibernica and Topographia Hibernica	
Leiden, Universiteitsbibliotheek	B.P.L. 13	Latin	Topographia Hibernica	Early 14th century
London, British Library	Add. 4783		Extracts from De rebus a se gestis	
London, British Library	Add. 4785	Latin	Book II of Descriptio Kambriae	1641
London, British Library	Add. 4787	Latin	Extracts from De rebus a se gestis	Early 17th century
London, British Library	Add. 4822	Latin	Extracts from an abridged version of Topographia Hibernica	17th century
London, British Library	Add. 17920	Provençal	Abridged translation of Topographia Hibernica	14th century
London, British Library	Add. 19513	Latin	Abridged version of Topographia Hibernica	14th century
London, British Library	Add. 33991	Latin	Topographia Hibernica	Late 12th century to early 13th century
London, British Library	Add. 34762	Latin	Topographia Hibernica, Expugnatio Hibernica and Itinerarium Kambriae	Early 13th century
London, British Library	Add. 40674	Middle English	Abridged translation of Expugnatio Hibernica	15th century
London, British Library	Add. 43706	Latin	Descriptio Kambriae and Itinerarium Kambriae	1562
London, British Library	Add. 44922	Latin	Abridged version of Topographia Hibernica	Early 13th century
London, British Library	Add. 48037	Latin	Extract from De principis instructione	Late 16th to early 17th century
London, British Library	Arundel 14	Latin	Topographia Hibernica	Late 12th century
London, British Library	Cotton Claudius E.viii	Latin	Extracts from Topographia Hibernica and Expugnatio Hibernica	c. 1400
London, British Library	Cotton Cleopatra D.v	Latin	Topographia Hibernica, Expugnatio Hibernica and Symbolum electorum	14th century
London, British Library	Cotton Domitian A.i	Latin	Itinerarium Kambriae, Descriptio Kambriae, Retractationes and Catalogus breuior librorum suorum	Late 13th century
London, British Library	Cotton Domitian A.v	Latin	De iure et statu meneuensis ecclesiae	Early 13th century
London, British Library	Cotton Faustina C.iv	Latin	Topographia Hibernica	Late 16th century
London, British Library	Cotton Julius B.xiii	Latin	De principis instructione	14th century
London, British Library	Cotton Nero D.viii	Latin	Descriptio Kambriae	Late 14th to early 15th century
London, British Library	Cotton Tiberius B.xiii	Latin	Speculum Ecclesiae and De rebus a se gestis	Early 13th century
London, British Library	Cotton Titus C.xii	Latin	Extract from De principis instructione	Late 16th to early 17th century
London, British Library	Cotton Vitellius C.x	Latin	Descriptio Kambriae	Late 14th to early 15th century
London, British Library	Cotton Vitellius C.x	English	Extract from De iure et statu meneuensis ecclesiae	late 16th century
London, British Library	Cotton Vitellius E.v	Latin	De iure et statu meneuensis ecclesiae, Descriptio Kambriae, Retractationes, Catalogus breuior librorum suorum and poems	Late 16th century
London, British Library	Cotton Vitellius E.vii	Latin	Extracts from Vita Sancti Dauidis and Vita Sancti Ethelberti	Late 12th century
London, British Library	Harley 177	Latin	Expugnatio Hibernica	14th century
London, British Library	Harley 310	Latin	Expugnatio Hibernica	Late 16th to early 17th century
London, British Library	Harley 359	Latin	Descriptio Kambriae, Retractationes, Catalogus breuior librorum suorum, an extract from De iure et statu meneuensis ecclesiae, an extract from De inuectionibus, Expugnatio Hibernica, Topographia Hibernica and Itinerarium Kambriae	Late 16th century
London, British Library	Harley 544	English	Retractationes, Catalogus breuior librorum suorum, and extracts from De iure et statu meneuensis ecclesiae and De inuectionibus	1575
London, British Library	Harley 551	English	Itinerarium Kambriae, Expugnatio Hibernica, Descriptio Kambriae and abridged version of Topographia Hibernica	1575-1576
London, British Library	Harley 912	Latin	Extracts from Itinerarium Kambriae and Descriptio Kambriae	14th century
London, British Library	Harley 1757	Latin	Descriptio Kambriae	Late 16th century
London, British Library	Harley 3724	Latin	Topographia Hibernica	Late 13th century to early 14th century
London, British Library	Harley 4003	Latin	Topographia Hibernica and Expugnatio Hibernica	Early 14th century
London, British Library	Harley MS 5270	Latin	Extracts from Speculum Ecclesiae	13th century
London, British Library	Lansdowne 229	Latin	Extracts from Itinerarium Kambriae and Expugnatio Hibernica	1573
London, British Library	Royal Appendix 85	Latin	Fragment of Descriptio Kambriae	Late 16th century
London, British Library	Royal 13.A.xiv	Latin	Topographia Hibernica and Expugnatio Hibernica	Late 13th century
London, British Library	Royal 13.B.viii	Latin	Topographia Hibernica, Expugnatio Hibernica and Itinerarium Kambriae	Late 12th century to early 13th century
London, British Library	Royal 13.B.xii	Latin	Two copies each of Itinerarium Kambriae and Descriptio Kambriae	Late 16th century
London, British Library	Royal 13.B.xviii	Latin	Fragment of Topographia Hibernica	14th century
London, British Library	Royal 13.C.i	Latin	Vita Sancti Dauidis	15th century
London, British Library	Royal 13.C.iii	Latin	Descriptio Kambriae	15th century
London, British Library	Royal 14.C.vi	Latin	Extracts from Topographia Hibernica and Expugnatio Hibernica	Early 14th century
London, British Library	Royal 14.C.xiii	Latin	Expugnatio Hibernica	1327-1352
London, British Library	Royal 13.D.i	Latin	Topographia Hibernica	
London, British Library	Sloane 1710	Latin	Book II of Descriptio Kambriae	17th century
London, College of Arms	Vincent 418	Latin	Topographia Hibernica	15th century
London, Lambeth Palace	236	Latin	Gemma ecclesiastica, letters and poems	Early 13th century
London, Lambeth Palace	248	English	Expugnatio Hibernica	Late 16th century
London, Lambeth Palace	263	English	Itinerarium Kambriae and Book I of Descriptio Kambriae	1602
London, Lambeth Palace	371	Latin	Expugnatio Hibernica	Early 13th century
London, Lambeth Palace	580	Latin	Extracts from Expugnatio Hibernica	1664-1695
London, Lambeth Palace	594	Latin	Extracts from Gemma ecclesiastica, Symbolum electorum and De principis instructione	1664-1695
London, Lambeth Palace	598	Middle English	Expugnatio Hibernica	15th century
London, Lambeth Palace	622	Latin	Topographia Hibernica and Expugnatio Hibernica	15th century
London, Lambeth Palace	623 (Book of Howth)	English	Abridged version of Expugnatio Hibernica	16th century (after 1551)
London, Westminster Abbey	23	Latin	Topographia Hibernica	Late 12th century
Manchester, John Rylands University Library	217	Latin	Extracts from Topographia Hibernica and Expugnatio Hibernica	15th century
Oxford, Bodleian Library	Auctarium D.2.9	Latin	Extracts from Symbolum electorum	Mid 13th century
Oxford, Bodleian Library	Bodley 511	Latin	Topographia Hibernica	1513
Oxford, Bodleian Library	Fairfax 20	Latin	Topographia Hibernica	
Oxford, Bodleian Library	James 2	Latin	Extracts from Speculum Ecclesiae and De iure et statu meneuensis ecclesiae	1592-1638
Oxford, Bodleian Library	James 18	Latin	Extracts from De principis instructione	1624-1638
Oxford, Bodleian Library	Laud Misc. 526	Middle English	Extracts from Expugnatio Hibernica	Mid 15th century
Oxford, Bodleian Library	Laud Misc. 720	Latin	Topographia Hibernica	Second half of the 13th century
Oxford, Bodleian Library	Rawlinson B.188	Latin	Topographia Hibernica, Expugnatio Hibernica and Itinerarium Kambriae	Late 12th century to early 13th century
Oxford, Bodleian Library	Rawlinson B.471	Latin	Extracts from Itinerarium Kambriae and Descriptio Kambriae	1560
Oxford, Bodleian Library	Rawlinson B.475	Irish	Expugnatio Hibernica	17th century
Oxford, Bodleian Library	Rawlinson B.483	Latin	Topographia Hibernica	Early 13th century
Oxford, Bodleian Library	Rawlinson B.490	Middle English	Abridged version of Expugnatio Hibernica	15th century (after 1419)
Oxford, Bodleian Library	Rawlinson D.125	Latin	Fragment of Expugnatio Hibernica	Late 13th century
Oxford, Bodleian Library	Tanner 2	Latin	Topographia Hibernica	Early 16th century
Oxford, Bodleian Library	Twyne 22	Latin	Extracts from De rebus a se gestis	
Oxford, Corpus Christi College	217	Latin	Descriptio Kambriae	17th century
Oxford, Corpus Christi College	263	Latin	Extracts from Topographia Hibernica and Itinerarium Kambriae	1602
Paris, Bibliothèque nationale de France	Latin 4126	Latin	Topographia Hibernica	14th century
Paris, Bibliothèque nationale de France	Latin 4846	Latin	Topographia Hibernica	Late 12th century to early 13th century
Paris, Bibliothèque nationale de France	Latin 11111	Latin	Topographia Hibernica	Late 13th century
Rome, Biblioteca Apostolica Vaticana	Reg. Lat. 470	Latin	De inuectionibus and Speculum Duorum	Early 13th century
