= Mappa Kambriae =

Lost map of Wales

The Mappa Kambriae, or Map of Wales, is a lost map of Wales by Gerald of Wales, intended to illustrate his Descriptio Cambriae, and showing the mountains, rivers, woods, castles, cathedrals, churches, and monasteries of Wales.

It was an early example of an autonomous regional map, and was likely destroyed in the 1694 fire at Westminster Abbey.

== Background ==
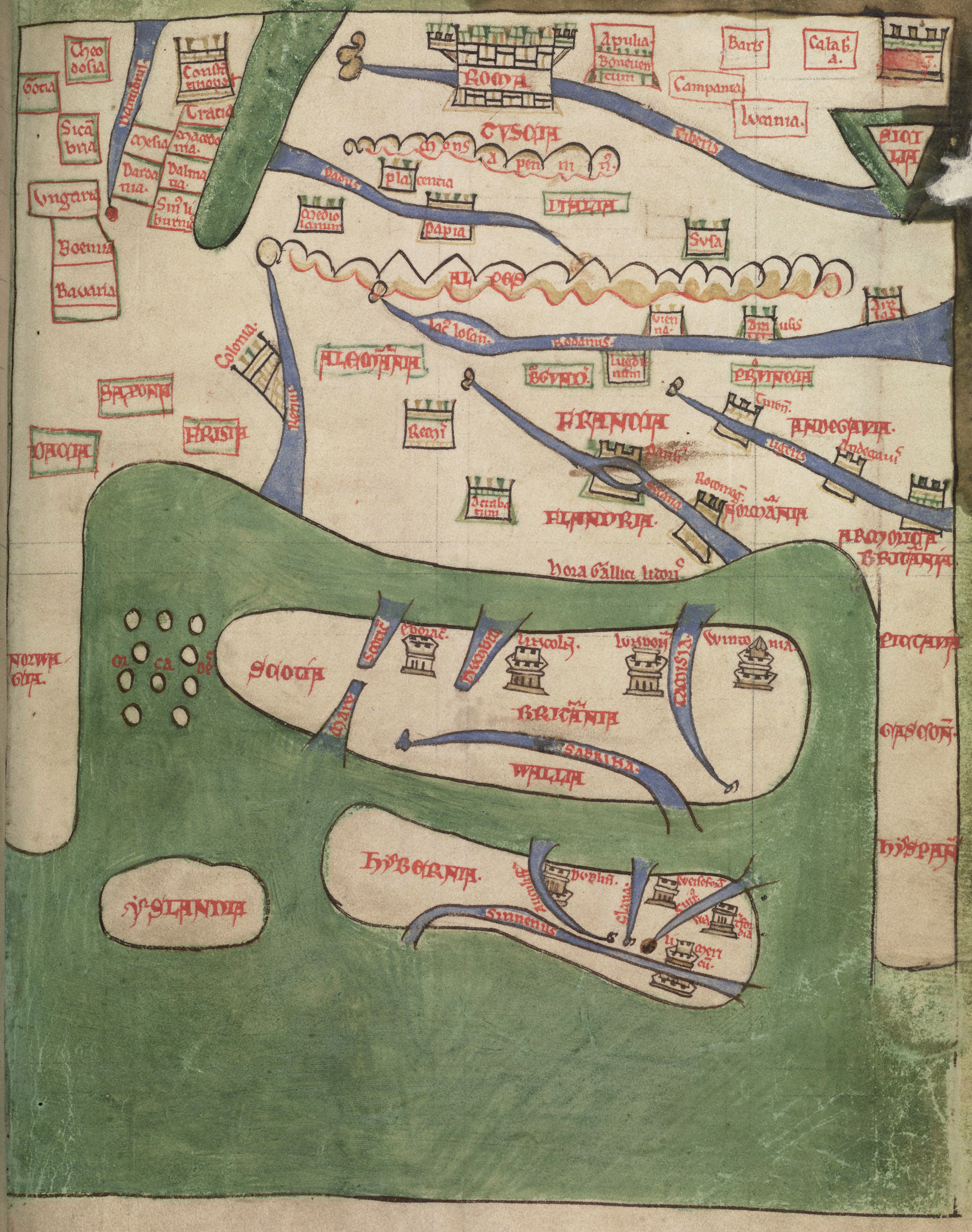
Schematic map of Britain and Ireland from Gerald's Topographia Hibernica

Gerald of Wales was a scholar and churchman, born to a mixed Norman and Welsh family among the marcher gentry of South Wales.

He issued the first edition of the Itinerarium Cambriae c. 1191, and the first edition of the Descriptio Cambriae c. 1194. Around 1196 he retired to Lincoln to study theology under William de Montibus until c. 1199, during which period he dedicated new editions of the Descriptio and Itinerarium to Hugh, bishop of Lincoln.

Two maps are associated with Gerald's works: the lost Mappa Kambriae, and a schematic map of Britain and Ireland found in manuscripts of the Topographia Hibernica.

== History ==
Gerald first referred to the Mappa Kambriae in his Catalogus brevior librorum suorum, where he wrote that he had created a map of Wales to illustrate his Descriptio Cambriae. He referred to it again in his c. 1218-1220 Epistola ad Capitulum Herefordensis, or Letter to the Hereford Chapter, and promised to send it to Hereford to accompany the Descriptio Cambriae and Itinerarium Cambriae that were already held by the Chapter.

In this letter Gerald described the map and his aims in its creation, saying that it required considerable labour from him, and that his purpose in creating it was to exercise and sharpen his mind while avoiding idleness and otium.

The map is not known to have been mentioned again until 1691, when Henry Wharton in his Anglia Sacra wrote that a map of Wales was included in the Westminster Abbey manuscript of Gerald's Descriptio Cambriae. Wharton described the manuscript as dedicated to Hugh, bishop of Lincoln.

A Register of the old library of Westminster recorded that John Williams, archbishop of York and dean of Westminster, gave the abbey a volume described as Giraldi Cambrensis descriptio Walliae. Under the same description, the volume was recorded in a 1672 catalogue of Westminster Abbey. This manuscript was last referenced under the title Descriptio Cambriae in Michael Maettori's Catalogi manuscriptorum Angliae et Hiberniae, issued in 1697, having been destroyed in the fire at Westminster Abbey in 1694.

James Conway Davies proposes that this manuscript was held in the library of Lincoln Cathedral, until Williams who was bishop of Lincoln from 1621 to 1641, and known not to be "uninterested in manuscripts" as well as being a notable Welshman, transferred the manuscript from Lincoln to Westminster.

== Description ==
Mappa Kambriae was drawn on a single narrow quarto sheet and contained considerable detail. Two descriptions of it survive, in Gerald's Letter to the Hereford Chapter and in Wharton's Anglia Sacra. Gerald describes it as containing "the steep mountains and deep woods, the rivers and streams, the castles which had been built, the cathedrals, and the many churches and monasteries, especially of the Cistercian order." Wharton described it similarly, as containing "besides the rivers, many mountains, the coast line, the boundaries with England, and the towns and castles of Wales".

In 1950 Davies attempted to reconstruct the contents of the map by "careful perusal" of Gerald's writings, providing a list of material, including mountains, rivers, streams, woods, castles, cathedrals, churches, and monasteries that were mentioned in these works and could have been included in the map, and suggesting that the map must have marked at least two hundred locations, not including the mountains, rivers, woods, coastline, or boundaries. In 2022 Nathalie Bouloux proposed that the topographical base of the map was likely formed by the mountains and river network, with the castles, cathedrals, churches, and monasteries then located upon this framework.

== Interpretation ==
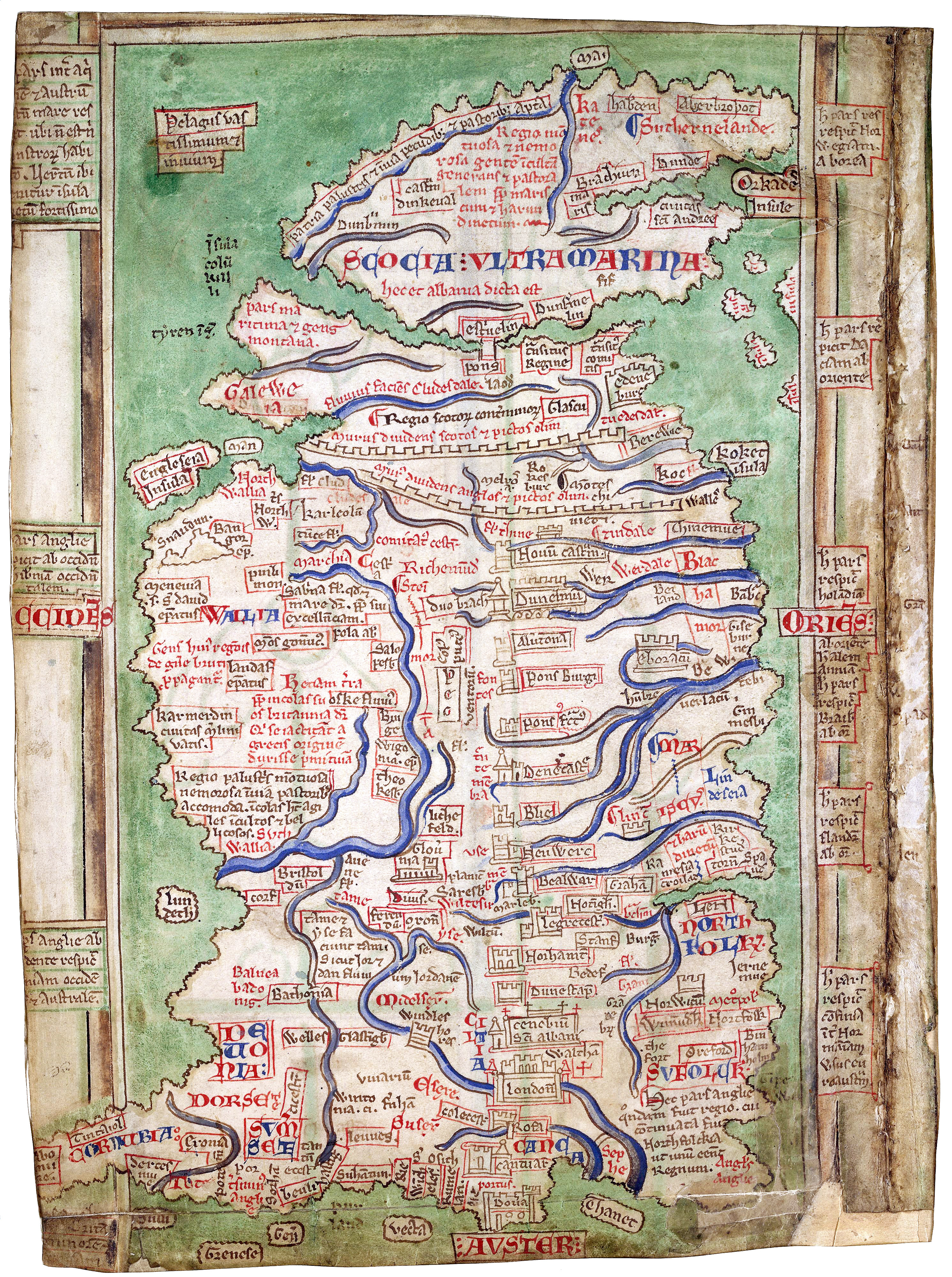
Matthew Paris's map of Britain

Davies contrasted the Mappa Kambriae with the maps of the British Isles found in manuscripts of the Topographia Hibernica. He argued that the two maps were not comparable, with the map of the British Isles being crude and lacking detail.

Bouloux considers it an original work, with the outline unlikely to have been copied from world maps as Wales was not presented in detail on those. She describes it as an early example of an autonomous regional map, created before the diffusion of Ptolemy's Geography acted as a catalyst for their proliferation at the end of the Middle Ages.

Bouloux interprets the creation of the map as both a celebration of his Welsh origins and a promotion of his talents. She also compared it to Matthew Paris's maps of Britain, and proposes that there may be a link between Paris's maps and the Mappa Kambriae, as Paris references the Descriptio Cambriae.
