= Cambridge University Library, Ff. i.27 =

Cambridge University Library, Ff. i.27 is a composite manuscript at the University of Cambridge. It was formed by adding a 14th-century Bury St Edmunds book to a compendium of material from 12th-century northern England (items 1 to 11 in the Contents). The latter compendium had once been part of Corpus Christi College Cambridge MS 66. With its original content, it had at one time been at Sawley Abbey in Lancashire, though it was probably produced somewhere else, perhaps Durham. It is a source for the Durham poem, which describes the city and its relics.

Ff. 1.27 as a whole came together in the 15th century or later, but pages 1 to 236 are earlier and paleographic evidence suggests that, with the exception of a continuation of Gildas' De excidio Britanniae dating to the 14th century, its material shares the same origin. Ff. i 27 and Corpus Christi 66 manuscripts probably had a common origin with Corpus Christi College Cambridge MS. 139 ("CCCC 139") as well, part of Ff. 1.27 being written in the same hand as part of 139's version of the Historia Regum.

== Contents ==
Part	Pages	Description
I	1–14	Gildas, De Excidio Britanniae
I	14–40	Historia Brittonum (Pseudo-Nennius recension)
II	41–71	Historia Brittonum (Pseudo-Gildas recension)
III	73–120	Bede, De Temporibus
IV(a)	122	Preface to Symeon of Durham's Libellus de Exordio
IV(b)	123–125	Summary of Libellus de Exordio
IV(c)	125–128	Chapter headings for the Libellus de Exordio
IV(d)	128–130	Genealogy of Æthelwulf from William of Malmesbury's Gesta Regum Anglorum (chs 115 and 116), Series Regum Northymbrensium and list of English bishoprics and shires
IV(e)	129–186	Symeon of Durham's Libellus de Exordio
IV	187–194	A continuation of Libellus de Exordio to death of Geoffrey Rufus (died 1141), but including a passage on Hugh de Puiset (bishop of Durham 1153–1195)
IV	194	List of Durham relics
V	195–201	Historia de Sancto Cuthberto
V	201–202	List of gifts from Æthelstan, king of England, to St Cuthbert
VI	203–215	Æthelwulf, De Abbatibus
VI	215-216	Æthelwulf, De regibus et regnis et episcopatibus totius Angliae
VII	217-220	Visiones
VIII	221–236	Richard of Hexham, De Statu et Episcopis Hagustaldensis Ecclesie
IX	237–242	Gilbert of Limerick, De Statu Ecclesie
X	243-252	Britannorum reges, Cronicum de regibus Francorum, etc
XI	253-355	Gerald of Wales, Topographia Hibernica
XI	355-453	Gerald of Wales, Expugnatio Hibernica
XII	453-471	Vita Sancti Patricii Episcopi
XIII	473-494	Gerald of Wales, Descriptio Kambriae
XIV	499-567	Gerald of Wales, Itinerarium Kambriae
XIV	568-600	H. de Saltereia, Tractatus de Purgatorio Sancti Patricii
XIV	600-609	Sigebert of Gembloux, Chronicon (excerpts)
XIV	610-618	Geoffrey of Monmouth, Historia Regum Britanniae, VII, Vaticinium Merlini
XIV	618-636	Rhygyfarch, Vita Sancti David
XV	638-642	Geoffrey of Wells, De Infantia Sancti Edmundi
