= De principis instructione =

Medieval treatise on kingship by Gerald of Wales

- Dedicated to: Prince Louis of France
- Language: Latin
- Date: 1191
- Date of issue: 1216–1217
- State of existence: Extant
- First printed edition: 1715
- Genre: Mirror for princes, historical narrative

De principis instructione, translated variously as Instruction for a Ruler or The Instruction of Princes is a medieval Latin treatise on kingship by Gerald of Wales. The first distinction, or book, takes the form of a traditional "mirror for princes", centred on the difference between a good prince and a tyrant. The second and third present a narrative of Henry II's rise and fall, framed through divine providence and a wheel of fortune, and constitute a sustained polemic against him and the Angevin dynasty.

The first distinction likely circulated c. 1191, while the complete work was likely released c. 1216×1217 during the First Barons' War when the Angevin dynasty appeared on the verge of collapse.

Surviving only in a single manuscript, Cotton MS Julius B XIII, De principis instructione did not circulate widely though it was used for the Polychronicon by Ranulph Higden. Extracts were first printed in 1715, and most of the work was published in 1891 in the Rolls Series. The complete work with parallel text translation was published in 2018.

Modern scholars consider it an important source for historical events of the period, including as evidence for views critical of the English monarchy at the time of the Magna Carta.

== Background ==
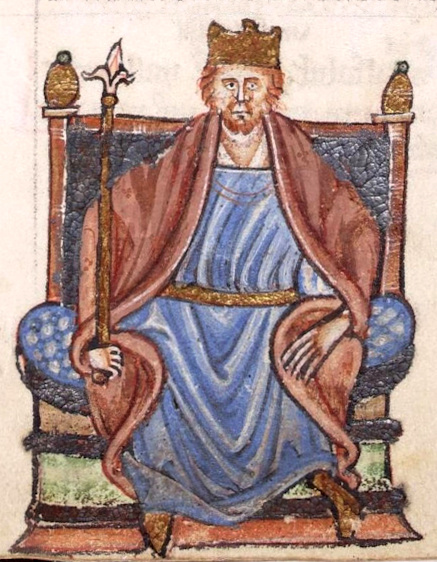
Contemporary miniature of Henry II from the Topographia Hibernica, c. 1186–1188

In the twelfth century Henry II came to rule over a collection of territories often termed by historians the Angevin Empire, consisting of the English monarchy and extensive lands in France, and stretching from Northumberland to the Pyrenees.

Henry II planned to partition his lands among his sons. His eldest son, Henry, was to receive the Kingdom of England and the County of Anjou, and was crowned Junior King in 1170. Richard received the Duchy of Aquitaine in 1172, and Geoffrey was to become count of Brittany through his 1166 betrothal to its heiress. John, born in 1167, was not initially allocated lands, and Henry II's later attempts to provide for him created tensions with his older sons, culminating in their rebellion of 1173-1174.

The Young King Henry died in 1183, and Geoffrey died in 1186, but Henry II's continued efforts to grant lands to John fomented resentment in Richard. Fearing disinheritance in John's favour, Richard allied with King Philip II of France against his father in 1188-1189.

Henry II died in July 1189, shortly after learning that John too had abandoned him, and Richard inherited his lands. Richard died childless in 1199 and was succeeded by John. In 1204 John lost most of his French territories to Philip and his attempts to recover them, and the resulting financial burdens imposed on his subjects, helped drive the English barons into rebellion in 1215.

In late 1215 the barons offered the English Crown to Philip's son Louis, who landed in England in May 1216. John died of illness in October and was succeeded by his young son, Henry III. In November the regency government reissued Magna Carta, and in December eleven of the twelve bishops who supported Louis went over to Henry. This may have weakened the resolve of Louis's supporters, but it did not produce a wider wave of baronial defections. In May 1217 Louis's army was defeated at Lincoln, and his fleet was defeated off Sandwich in August. The war ended in September with the Treaty of Lambeth.

=== Mirror for princes ===
The mirror for princes genre emerged in medieval Latin Christendom as a form of political advice literature. Drawing on classical, biblical, and patristic precedents, these texts offered rulers guidance on virtues and vices, counsel and governance, often framed through exempla of good and bad monarchs. They circulated from the early Middle Ages and especially in the twelfth and thirteenth centuries.

The first mirror for princes written in England was Policraticus, written c. 1159 by John of Salisbury. It was followed decades later by Gerald's De principis instructione. No further mirrors would be written in England until c. 1411×1412, when Thomas Hoccleve wrote Regement of Princes.

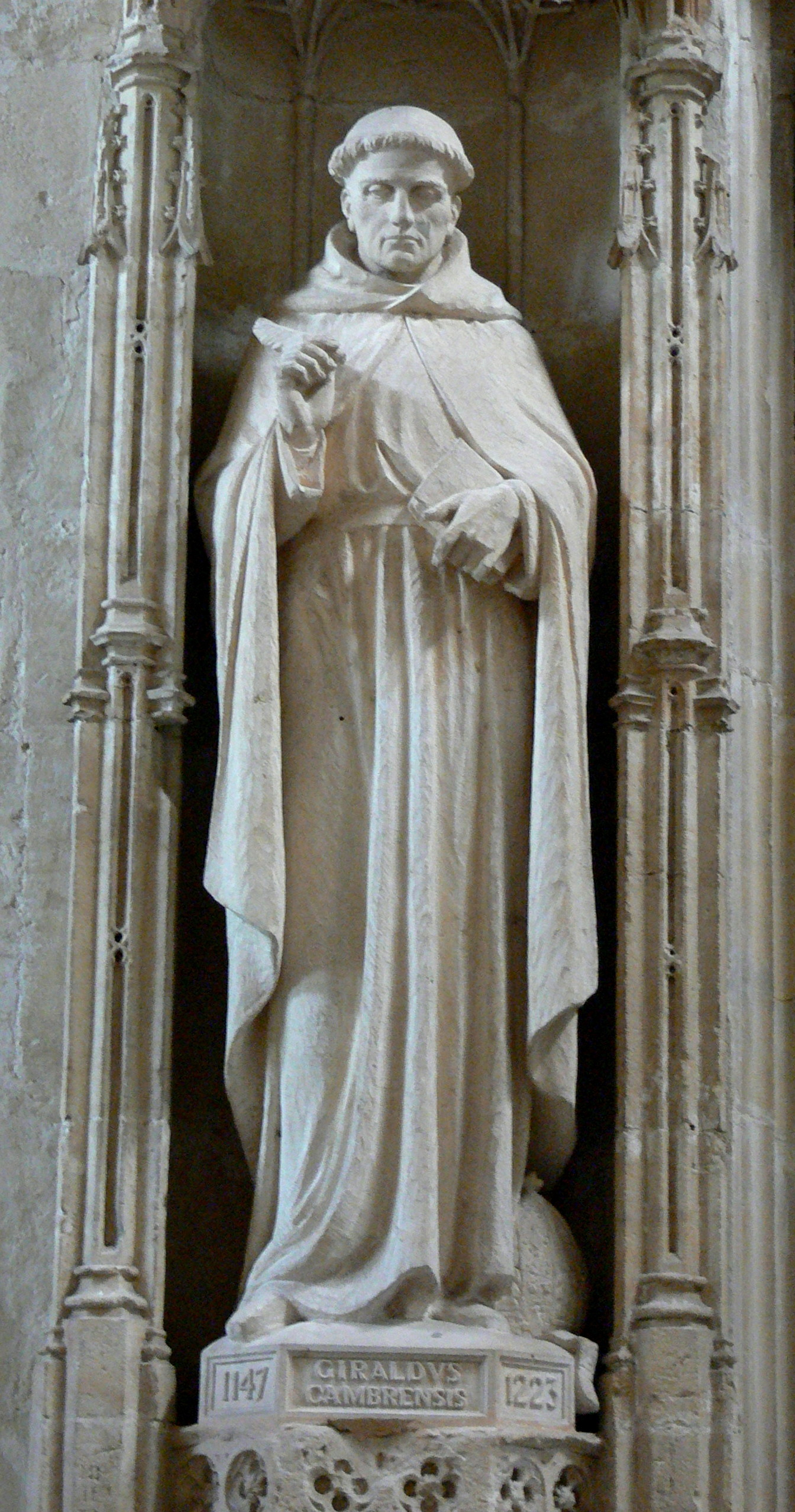
Statue of Gerald of Wales in St Davids Cathedral

=== Gerald of Wales ===
Gerald of Wales was a scholar and churchman, born to a mixed Norman and Welsh family among the marcher gentry of South Wales. He studied in St Peter's Abbey in Gloucester before moving to Paris where he studied the trivium.

After this first period in Paris he returned to Wales, where in 1176 he sought election to the see of St Davids but due to Henry II's opposition was unsuccessful despite the support from the monks. He then returned to Paris for about three years, until c. 1180, where he studied canon law and theology, lecturing on the former.

In February 1183 he visited Ireland with his cousin, Philip de Barry, and stayed for about a year, later using this experience to write his Topographia Hibernica and Expugnatio Hibernica. After returning and at the urging of Henry II, he reluctantly accepted the position of royal clerk, where he was employed c. 1184-94.

By the early 1190s he had become dissatisfied with the rewards he had received for his service under Henry II and Richard I. His frustration, sharpened by John's refusal to confirm his election to the see of St Davids in 1199, is reflected in the writing of De principis instructione which was completed when Gerald's hopes of advancement through Angevin patronage had largely faded.

By the 1210s Gerald's hostility to the Angevins climaxed in a desire to see England under French rule, and during the First Barons' War, when French forces landed in England to oppose King John, Gerald supported the French.

== Composition and textual history ==
De principis instructione, sometimes rendered as Liber de principis instructione and translated variously as The Instruction of Princes or Instruction for a Ruler, is a medieval Latin treatise on kingship by Gerald of Wales that serves as a polemical critique of contemporary English governance. Consisting of three books, termed by Gerald distinctiones, the first takes the form of a traditional "mirror for princes", while the second and third are an extended polemic against Henry II and his heirs, identifying and denouncing their vices.

=== Editions and dating ===
Two editions of De principis instructione were created. A first edition was likely circulated c. 1191, consisting only of the first distinction and an original prelude. This dating is based on a reference in a 1191 first edition manuscript of Gerald's Itinerarium Kambriae in which, referring to the death of Henry II, Gerald writes "as we have narrated in the book De principis instructione".

This also suggests that parts of the second and third distinctions had already been written, but that their publication was suppressed. A passage at the end of the first distinction states that they were "not yet completed and polished" and were "awaiting a safer and more serene time for publication".

A later date is possible, since the circulation of De principis instructione is closely tied to Gerald's departure from court, for which dates from 1191 to 1196 have been advanced. However, it is certain that it was issued at some point in the last decade of the twelfth century.

Better estimates are available for the second edition, which was released in 1216×1217 during the First Barons' War when the Angevin dynasty appeared on the verge of collapse, making it the safest time to publish a bitter polemic against King Henry II and his dynasty.

This dating is supported by internal and external evidence. In De iure et statu Menevensis ecclesia, written c. 1218, Gerald mentions that he published De principis instructione when he was seventy. Since he was born c. 1146, this would place publication c. 1216. The text also cannot have been completed before Louis's landing in May 1216, since passages in it refer to his behaviour in the English campaign.

George F. Warner, editor of the Rolls Series, argued that the text took its final form after King John's death in October 1216. Bartlett, however, argues from internal evidence that it may have been completed earlier, since one passage states that John had "begun to be destroyed", which implies composition before his death. Gerald is himself equivocal, writing that "six or seven" of the Norman kings had died by the time of writing. If six had died, he was writing before John's death; if seven, after it.

=== Dedication ===
Late in the composition of De principis instructione, Gerald inserted a quasi-dedication to Prince Louis of France, stating that if he were to dedicate the work, it would be to Louis "both because he has been deeply instructed in letters and the liberal arts from his earliest years . . . and because he is famous for his generosity". This late insertion indicates that the work was not originally intended for dedication to a specific ruler.

== Contents ==
Intended to instruct princes in governance, the first distinction of De principis instructione offers moral teaching drawn from earlier authors. The second and third distinctions give instruction through historical examples and narrate the reign of Henry II. They include material on French and English politics, as well as texts of letters and treaties, some of which survive only through Gerald.

The first distinction constitutes the majority of the work. Its chapters are far longer, averaging 2,530 words, compared with 492 in the second distinction and 758 in the third. It originally opened with a preface of about 4,400 words which criticised courtly values and framed Gerald's reward not in material terms but in the appreciation of future generations. For the second edition, this preface was shortened and the quasi-dedication to Prince Louis was inserted.

=== First distinction ===
Gerald described the first distinction as "containing doctrine and precepts on the instruction of a prince drawn from theological, pagan, and moral writings". It offers moral teaching chiefly through historical anecdotes drawn from the Bible, Roman authors, the Church Fathers, and other sources. It mines biblical and ancient history for examples of good and wicked behaviour, with prominent attention to David, Julius Caesar, and Augustus, among other rulers.

It consists of twenty-one chapters, with the first fifteen chapters listing moral virtues that a ruler should possess. These are moderation, gentleness, shyness, chastity, patience, temperance, clemency, generosity, magnificence, justice, prudence, foresight, modesty, boldness and bravery, and glory and nobility. The final six chapters turn more broadly to the difference between good princes and tyrants.

The work also provides a few recent historical narratives, including material on the Picts and the Scots, the discovery of the tomb of King Arthur and Guinevere, Louis VII of France, Edward the Confessor, Thomas Becket, and recent Scottish kings.

=== Second distinction ===
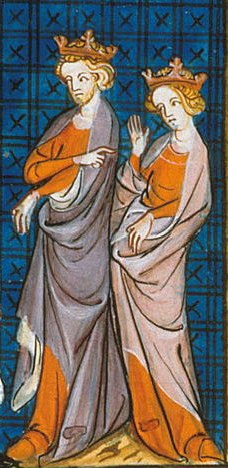
14th-century representation of Henry II and Eleanor of Aquitaine

The second distinction covers Henry's reign down to 1185, a period Gerald described as one in which "everything turned out victoriously."

In it Gerald levels a series of criticisms against Henry II: that he married his lord's wife, Eleanor, after abducting her, that he oppressed the nobility, that he sold and delayed justice, that he was fickle and deceitful, that he did not keep his word, faith, and oath, that he was adulterous and without devotion, and that he was "the hammer of the church and the son born for its destruction".

It includes an account of a conversation between Gerald and Henry which historians consider to be essentially true. Gerald says that he told Henry that Heraclius's visit to England brought honour to both the king and the kingdom. Henry, according to Gerald, did not take his words well and replied "If the patriarch or anyone else comes to us, they are seeking their own advantage, not ours". Gerald then answered that Henry should count it an honour to have been chosen for such service to the church, to which Henry replies "These clerks can incite us boldly to arms and danger, since they themselves will receive no blows in the struggle, nor will they undertake any burdens which they can avoid."

The distinction includes a prophecy supposedly delivered by Heraclius to Henry II during the same visit, though modern historians have called it "utterly implausible". In it Henry was declared to have abandoned God and to have been abandoned in turn, and that because of this "your glory will be turned to disaster, your honour to ignominy, until your last gasp"

The distinction includes four royal documents and five papal letters. The royal documents include the 1177 Treaty of Ivry, two letters from Henry II to Ranulf de Glanville dated 1180 and 1182, and Henry's 1182 will. The latter three may have been obtained from de Glanville.

The papal letters include Laudabiliter from Adrian IV, Quoniam ea and Quanto personam tuam from Alexander III, Cum cuncti predecessores from Lucius III, and Dum attendinus from Urban III.

=== Third distinction ===
The third distinction covers the last four years of Henry's reign, when success gave way to failure. It treats the successes of Philip II of France, the rebellions of Henry's sons Richard and John, and Henry II's final days.

From the fourteenth to the twenty-first chapters it includes an extended account of the Third Crusade, whose failure Gerald blames on Henry, before returning to Henry. This includes two letters, one purportedly from Barbarossa to Saladin, and one from Saladin to Barbarossa.

It describes Henry's flight from Philip and Richard after the battle of Le Mans in 1189, and his conscious rejection of God as he looks back at the city in flames, saying "Today, O God, to pile up confusion and increase my shame, you have so foully taken from me the city I loved most in the world, where I was born and raised, where my father lies buried and St. Julian's body is interred. So I will repay you for such a deed as far as I can, by taking away from you that which you love most in me."

It concludes with Henry, after the losses of Châteauroux, Le Mans, and Tours, falling ill with fever and placing himself at Philip's mercy. He then learns that his favourite son John has turned against him and says "now let everything go as it will, I care no more for myself or the world", and dies on 6 July 1189.

In this distinction Gerald includes several dream-visions concerning Henry II's fate, many vivid and violent and marked by images of defilement and filth. He attributes these to several sources and includes one which he claimed to have experienced himself, in which Henry's corpse lies abandoned and alone "as if it were haunted by unclear things".

The distinction also includes a single papal letter, Quam gravis et horribilis of Clement III.

== Themes and genre ==
Though nominally a mirror-for-princes text, De principis instructione is also a personal drama of the rise and fall of Henry II that Michael Staunton argues is the closest work by a contemporary to a biography of Henry II. It is characterised by vanity and conceit, and by vindictive delight in the downfall of Henry II and his line.

The distinctions are generally chronological, though there are exceptions, including placing the 1172 Compromise of Avranches after the 1177 Treaty of Ivry.

It contains inconsistencies caused by Gerald's extensive revisions. One instance involves Gerald praying that God will preserve King John "for the tranquil peace of the people and ecclesiastical liberty", but later extensively condemning him for his "wicked tyranny".

=== First distinction ===
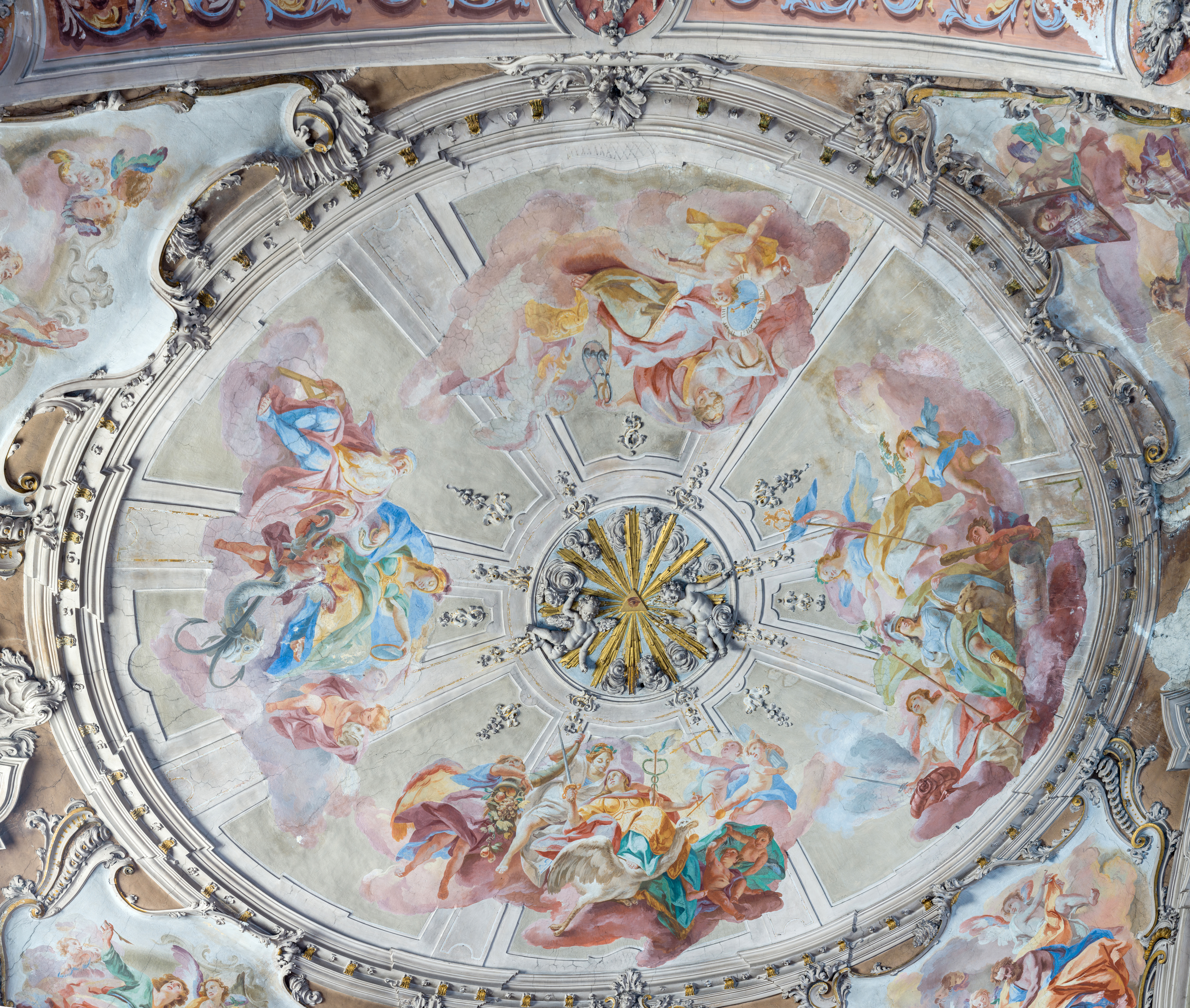
Fresco with allegories of the four cardinal virtues in the ‘’Assunta’’ church in Manerba del Garda

The first distinction is a conventional mirror-for-princes text, a medieval genre of princely instruction. Bartlett has described it as "largely derivative", an assessment that Charles F. Briggs and Cary J. Nederman agree with.

Structured around the virtues a ruler should possess, it sets out the qualities of an ideal prince. Its primary theme is the difference between a good prince and a tyrant. Gerald treats that difference as one of moral character, and much of the distinction is devoted to moral advice on the virtues a prince should possess through references to and quotations from various authorities, including the Bible, church fathers, and Roman and medieval authors.

According to István P. Bejczy, these virtues can be grouped under prudence, justice, fortitude, and temperance, though justice, which Gerald treated as the highest virtue, stands by itself.

Gerald himself places the greatest emphasis on the virtue of temperance and the notion that temperance keeps the other three cardinal virtues of justice, prudence, and fortitude in check. He also emphasises prudence, arguing that it moderates the other virtues and prevents justice from denigrating into cruelty, fortitude into temerity, and temperance into lassitude.

The distinction argues for the superiority of the French monarchy, praising French criminal law, calling Charlemagne the "greatest of modern rulers" and extolling them as the "natural and truly praiseworthy kings of France".

The first distinction has been widely criticised. H. E. Butler described it as a "dullest thing that Giraldus ever wrote" and Bartlett has said it is "not a sophisticated work of analysis" that contains "no political theory of any significance". Karl Schnith considers it to be Gerald's least readable work, and Frédérique Lachaud described it as the sort of work an ambitious cleric might compose to gain royal attention.

István P. Bejczy disagreed, arguing that the work deserves a better reputation and describing it as presenting the anti-Machiavellian idea that a prince should not be feared but loved, and that it succeeds at taking the cardinal virtues and their subdivisions and applying them to an educational purpose.

=== Second and third distinctions ===
The second and third distinctions differ sharply from the first and constitute a vicious condemnation of Henry II and his dynasty. Jean-Philippe Genet, Briggs, and Nederman describe them as an "anti-mirror" and an "impassioned assault on the corrupt rule of England of his day" while Nicholas Vincent describes them as a work in the Suetonian model, focusing on Henry's misdeeds. Together they present a narrative of Henry II's rise and fall intended to "teach the rule of government through example."

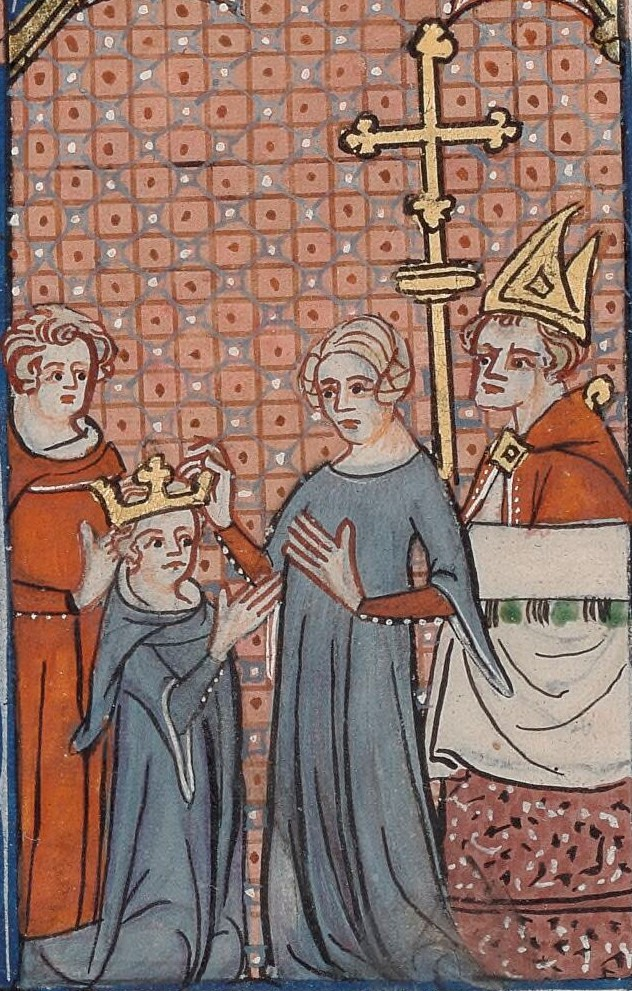
Heraclius (right) at Sibylla and Guy's coronation

This division of rise and fall is visible in the structure of the distinctions, with Gerald describing the second as dealing with Henry's "elevation and glory", and the third as dealing with his "painful downfall and catastrophe" and showing the "vengeance, disaster, and ignominy" inflicted upon Henry by God.

The turning point Gerald chose was Heraclius's 1185 embassy and Henry's refusal to go on crusade, which is shown at the climax of the second distinction and according to Gerald concludes with Heraclius issuing a prophetic warning against Henry after being rebuffed, an event that Robert Bartlett describes as "utterly implausible".

Gerald used two different frameworks to present this, merging the classical notion of a wheel of fortune with the Judeo-Christian notion of providence. He presents Henry's successes as God's encouragement and his failures God's chastisement and punishment, while also presenting his failures as an inevitable consequence of the turning of the wheel. These themes sometimes clashed, with the notion of the intervention of God conflicting with the notion of inevitable fate. At other times Gerald successfully harmonised them, presenting the consequences of the 1170 murder of Thomas Becket as moral causation, with the turning of the wheel altered to align with this.

Together, these distinctions present a tale of kingly hubris and divine retribution, of Henry's abandonment of God and God's abandonment of him in turn. They also contain several intermingled themes, including the conflicts between Henry II and his sons, relations with the kings of France, and events in the holy land.

The narrative extends beyond the fate of Henry II and to the dynasties of England and France, with Gerald presenting the entire line of Norman kings, from William the Conqueror to Henry II's son John, as tyrants, vicious and tainted by the presence of a "demon countess" in their lineage. By contrast, Gerald presents the Capetians favourably, showing them as noble kings who inspired love and loyalty from their subjects in contrast to the tyrannical Angevins.

The distinction concludes with failed hope, with the French whose arrival Gerald celebrated having been defeated and the Angevins not overthrown but instead persisting with John's infant son on the throne.

Kate Norgate wrote that "no careful and dispassionate reader of Gerald's writings can fail to see that in all of them his primary object was to glorify himself" and the distinctions are characterised by vindictiveness, vanity, conceit, and by gloating, as Gerald takes delight in the misfortune and fall of Henry and condemns both him and his dynasty.

== Manuscripts and publication history ==
De principis instructione did not circulate widely and the complete text of the second edition survives in a single manuscript, Cotton MS Julius B XIII. Fragments survive in four other manuscripts: BL Additional 48037, BL Cotton Titus C XII, Lambeth 594, and Bodleian MS James 18. Additional 48037 contains only a single paragraph and may have been copied from Julius B XIII. Titus C XII contains a brief summary of De principis instructione and was probably copied from Julius B XIII. Lambeth 594 contains a single page of extracts, also copied from Julius B XIII. James 18 is more extensive, containing thirteen extracts copied from Julius B XIII.

The first edition is lost, though the original preface survives alongside the second-edition prefaces in Gerald's anthology of his work, the Symbolum electorum, now held at Trinity College, Cambridge, MS R.7.11.

At least three copies of De principis instructione survived in the Middle Ages, and there is some evidence for another three. Of the three known to have survived, one is Julius B XIII and another is the exemplar from which Julius B XIII was copied. The third was recorded by John Leland in the library of the London Dominicans, which cannot have been either Julius B XIII or its exemplar, since its wording matches the original preface.

Produced at the end of the thirteenth or the beginning of the fourteenth century, Julius B XIII is a very poor copy. George Warner, writing in the Rolls Series edition, declared that "the scribe must have been at once a bad Latin scholar and a shockingly careless copyist". Brewer called it "written with extreme inaccuracy" and Bartlett wrote that "no one who has dealt with Julius B XIII has been very impressed by the scribe who wrote it".

Julius B XIII is bound with part of the unrelated Chronicle of Melrose. It measures about 175 by 260 millimetres and is written in gothic textualis, in two columns of thirty-eight lines across six bifolia.

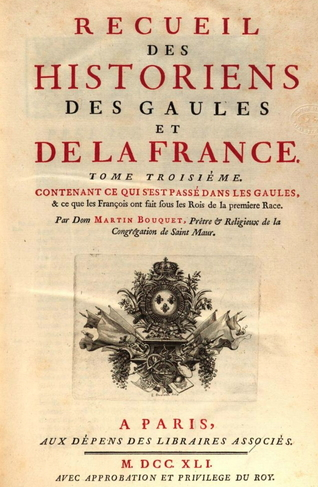
Title page of Recueil des historiens des Gaules et de la France

=== Publication history ===
Extracts first appeared in print in 1715, edited by Thomas Hearne from the notes of John Leland. More extensive extracts were published in 1822 by Dom Michel-John-Joseph Brial in Recueil des historiens des Gaules et de la France, and reprinted in 1879. In 1846 J. S. Brewer published the second and third books, along with parts of the first, and in 1858 Joseph Stevenson produced a translation of the second and third books, at which time De principis instructione reached its widest audience. Felix Liebermann reviewed it for the Monumenta Germaniae Historica in 1877, and in 1885 Reinhold Pauli published extracts in Monumenta Germaniae Historica Scriptores, focusing on material related to Germany. In 1891 George Warner edited the work for the Rolls Series, including most of the first book.

Warner's 1891 edition remained the standard edition until 2018, when Bartlett published his parallel text edition, Instruction for a Ruler, with translated English facing the original Latin, and including for the first time the complete text of the first book.

== Sources ==
Hundreds of passages in De principis instructione are taken from other works, including classical, biblical, patristic, and medieval texts. These borrowings are most extensive in the first book, but they are also present in the second and third. Gerald uses both short extracts, to supply authoritative statements, and longer ones, to furnish historical examples of conduct to imitate or avoid.

Gerald cites from fifty books of the Bible, including both the Old Testament and the New, most commonly Psalms and Matthew.

He makes no distinction between pagan and patristic writers, employing both to instruct the audience. Among Roman authors, he frequently draws on Seneca, Cicero, Ovid, and Horace among others, though he knew many of them only through compilations, including the Florilegium Angelicum and the Moralium Dogma Philosophorum. For the patristic writers he relied especially on Jerome and Ambrose, as well as on the standard biblical commentary and Defensor of Ligugé's Liber Scintillarum.

He also used a number of early medieval chroniclers, including Gildas's De Excidio et Conquestu Britanniae, which Gerald described as a model of "true history" and Einhard's Vita Karoli Magni, which he mistakenly attributed to Alcuin. His most important medieval source was Hugh of Fleury's Historia ecclesiastica, which he used for Caesar's civil war and for descriptions of the Amazons, Scythians, Parthians, and Carolingians.

Bartlett describes Gerald as one of the "great auto-plagiarists of the Middle Ages" and Gerald's own writings were a major source for De principis instructione. He draws heavily on his Topographia Hibernica and his Expugnatio Hibernica, and to a lesser extent on the Itinerarium Kambriae. He also took several substantial extracts from his Gemma ecclesiastica.

The account of Barbarossa's crusade in the third book of De principis instructione is identical to the self-contained account in chapters eighteen through twenty-four of the Itinerarium Regis Ricardi. Gerald may have taken his version from that work, but Hans Eberhard Mayer argues, and Bartlett concurs, that both the Itinerarium and Gerald drew on the same unidentified third source.

For his list of virtues Bejczy proposes that Gerald produced a composite drawn from the Moralium Dogma Philosophorum and Ambrose of Milan's De officiis, combined with material from Magister G.

== Reception and influence ==
Completed decades after the death of both Henry and Richard I, De principis instructione is an important and valuable source for historical events, including the history of the Angevin dynasty, the final days of Henry II, events in France during the period, and matters related to the house of Blois. It is also a key witness to views critical of the English monarchy at the time of the Magna Carta, and the second and third distinctions are considered important sources for the politics of the 1180s and 1190s.

It appears to have had little impact on England's kings and nobility, and its medieval use was limited. Ranulph Higden's Polychronicon is the only known medieval work to have relied directly on it, and Higden referred to it as "A Life of King Henry II in Three Books". Even so, the medieval impact of De principis instructione was wider than the surviving manuscript evidence alone would suggest due to the reliance of later authors, including Henry Knighton and John Brompton, on Higden's work.

Bartlett described it as a "rich but rambling diatribe against the Angevins" and Briggs and Nederman have described it as one of the "earliest major exemplars of medieval political mirror literature from the twelfth century" While the first distinction is largely derivative, Frédérique Lachaud has argued that engaging with the entire text "draws out a sort of originality that distinguishes it from the mainstream of princely mirrors", and Michael Staunton has described the second and third distinctions as the closest work by a contemporary to a biography of Henry II. Nicholas Vincent attributes the absence of biographies to the murder of Thomas Becket, whose death made panegyrical works impossible.

Staunton also writes that the work created a "memorable" image of Henry that "resonated for centuries", while noting that Gerald did not invent that image but built on a narrative already taking shape before Henry's death.
