= James Francis Dimock =

English cleric and historical scholar

James Francis Dimock (1810–1876) was an English cleric and historical scholar.

== Life ==
The son of John Giles Dimock, rector of Uppingham, Rutland, he was born at Stonehouse, Gloucestershire, on 22 November 1810. He was educated at Uppingham School under Dr Buckland, was admitted pensioner of St John's College, Cambridge, on 21 February 1829, and was elected Bell's scholar in 1830. He graduated B.A. in 1833, and M.A. in 1837.

Having been ordained deacon and priest by the bishop of Lincoln, Dimock was in 1846 appointed minor canon of Southwell Cathedral; he gave up the canonry on his appointment as rector of Barnburgh, near Doncaster, in 1863. In 1869 he was made prebendary of Lincoln, and he held the prebend with his rectory until his death at Barnburgh on 21 April 1876.

== Works ==
Dimock was interested in ecclesiastical and mediaeval history: his earliest work was Illustrations of the Collegiate Church of Southwell, London, 1854. In 1860 he published at Lincoln an edition of the Metrical Life of St. Hugh, and in 1864 he edited for the Rolls Series the Magna Vita S. Hugonis, Episcopi Lincolniensis, 1864. He also published The Thirty-nine Articles . . . explained, proved, and compared with her other authorized formularies, London, 1843, 1845, 2 vols.

His major work was his edition of part of the works of Giraldus Cambrensis for the Rolls Series; the first four volumes were edited by John Sherren Brewer, and vols. v-vii., which appeared between 1867 and 1877, by Dimock; the edition was completed with an eighth volume by George Frederic Warner.

== Notes ==
Attribution

This article incorporates text from a publication now in the public domain: Stephen, Leslie, ed. (1885). "Dimock, James Francis". Dictionary of National Biography. Vol. 2. London: Smith, Elder & Co.
