= Descriptio Cambriae =

Medieval treatise on Wales and its people

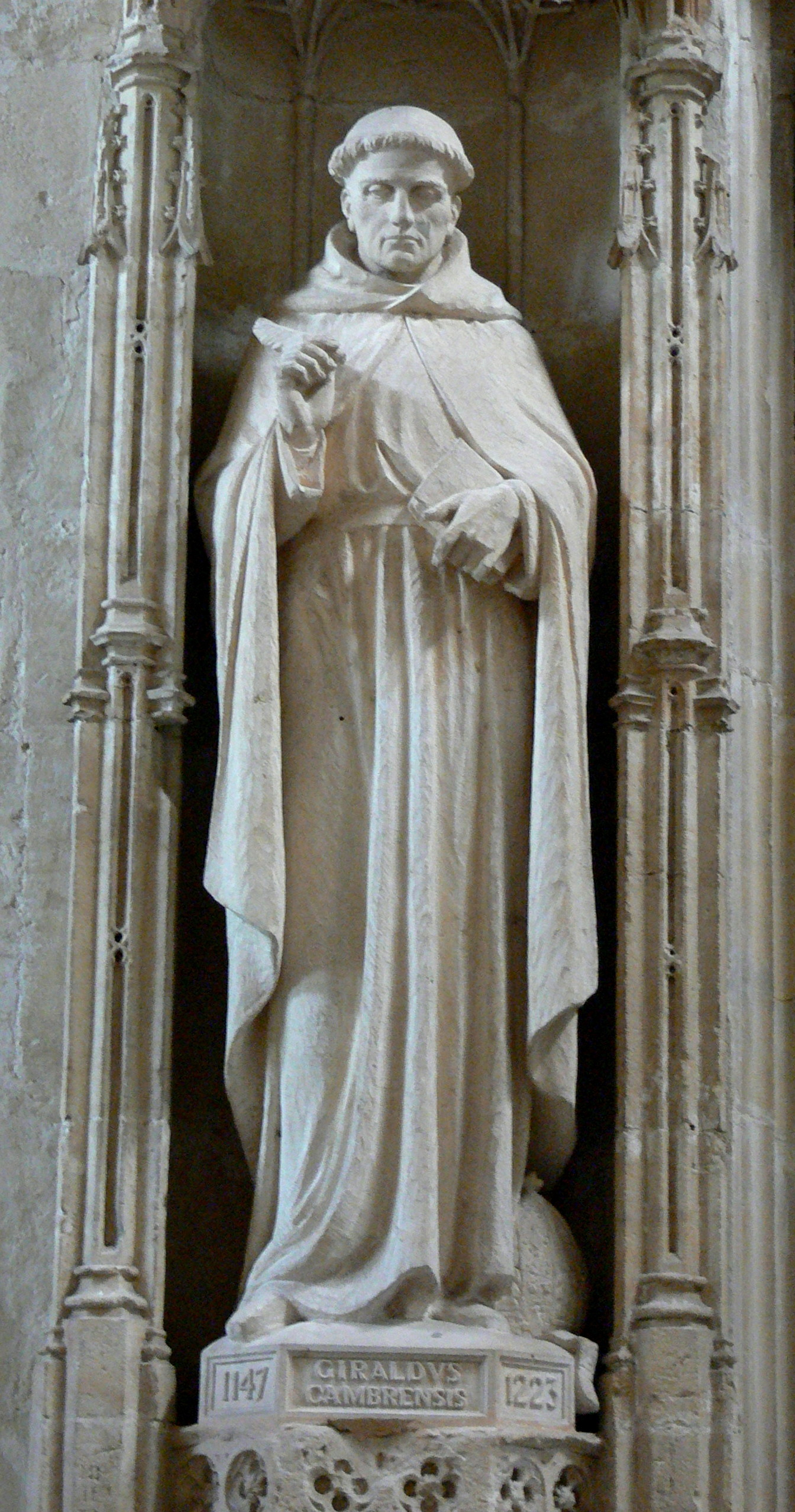
Statue of Gerald of Wales in St. David’s Cathedral

The Descriptio Cambriae or Descriptio Kambriae (Description of Wales) is a geographical and ethnographic treatise on Wales and its people dating from 1193 or 1194. The Descriptio’s author Gerald of Wales (or Giraldus Cambrensis) was a prominent churchman of Welsh birth and mixed Norman-Welsh ancestry. It is divided into two books, the first concentrating on the virtues of the Welsh people, and the second on their faults.

== Summary ==
In the First Preface Gerald justifies his decision to write on the subject of his own country, describing those things around him that have hitherto gone unrecorded, rather than treating of classical subjects which have been better dealt with by others. In the future he plans to write an unspecified magnum opus, but for the time being he will describe Wales, taking the 6th-century writer Gildas for his model. In the Second Preface Gerald praises his dedicatee, and asks him to read the Descriptio. He declares his love of literature, which has inspired him to undertake the hard work needed to research and write such a book. He hopes to be rewarded with the attention and praise of readers, now and in the future.

Book 1 begins with a description of the geographical extent of Wales, and of the country's physical ruggedness. Wales is, says Gerald, divided into the principalities of Gwynedd, Powys and Deheubarth, and has been since the kingdom of Rhodri Mawr was split between his three sons, each of whose descendants down to the present prince are then listed. He then gives the number of cantrefs into which each principality is divided, and names their palaces and dioceses. The course of each of Wales’s principal rivers is described, with a lengthy digression on the habits of the beaver. The author compares the fertility of the various regions of Wales, and the purity of their Welsh, then discusses the etymology of the names Cambria and Wales. He outlines the high military spirit, weapons, armour and tactics of the Welsh, then, turning to their customs in times of peace, describes their frugality, hospitality to strangers, table manners and sleeping habits, and their care of their teeth and facial hair. He next turns to the talents of the Welsh people in the fields of instrumental music, bardic poetry (notable for its lavish use of alliteration), and part-singing. Gerald praises their sense of humour, instancing several Welsh witticisms and also some classical Latin ones. Their boldness in speaking he attributes to their supposed descent from the Trojans, which also explains the many Welsh words and personal-names derived from Greek and Latin. In the same way, the existence in Wales of soothsayers who foretell the future when in an ecstatic trance reminds him of similar Trojan prophets. Gerald discusses the possible divine inspiration of these prophecies, and concludes that knowledge of the future can be given to pagans as well as to Christians. He asserts the respect paid by the Welsh to noble ancestry, and digresses into some notes on their farming and fishing practices. He praises their piety and respect for the clergy, and concludes the book:

The Welsh go to extremes in all matters. You may never find anyone worse than a bad Welshman, but you will certainly never find anyone better than a good one. A happy and prosperous race indeed, a people blessed and blessed again, if only they had good prelates and pastors, and one single prince and he a just one!

A short preface to Book 2 announces Gerald's intention of now describing the Welsh people's worse points. He begins by complaining of their constant perjuries and lack of good faith, then moves on to their propensity towards living by robbery and plunder. In this they show no courage, he says, and goes on to show from historical examples that in the past they have been cowardly or heroic as their circumstances changed. At present they excel at guerrilla warfare, but in a pitched battle they flee if their first attack fails. They are greedy for land, and their princely families are often divided between warring brothers, though foster-brothers are much closer. They are greedy also for food. Gerald complains that the Welsh marry within the degrees of consanguinity prohibited by the Church, and that they pass on church benefices from father to son. He denounces a tendency toward homosexuality among the luxurious ancient Britons, but admits that in modern times hardship has eradicated this practice. They were beaten down by successive Anglo-Saxon assaults, but have had a little more success against the Normans. Gerald goes on to give detailed strategic advice on how to conquer and rule Wales, laying especial stress on the leading part that the Marcher lords, with their local knowledge, should play in the attack and in the garrisoning and administering of conquered territory. The Welsh are to be turned against each other wherever possible, and once defeated they are to be treated firmly but with respect. Finally, he advises the Welsh that they can best resist attack by adopting Norman methods of warfare, by unity, and by holding firm to their love of freedom. He sums up their patriotism by quoting the words of an old man of Pencader who once told Henry II:

My Lord King, this nation may now be harassed, weakened and decimated by your soldiery, as it has so often been by others in former times; but it will never be totally destroyed by the wrath of man, unless at the same time it is punished by the wrath of God. Whatever else may come to pass, I do not think that on the Day of Direst Judgement any race other than the Welsh, or any other language, will give answer to the Supreme Judge of all for this small corner of the earth.

== Composition and manuscripts ==
The Descriptio Cambriae, like its companion-piece the Itinerarium Cambriae, grew out of a tour of Wales Gerald had undertaken in 1188 along with Baldwin, Archbishop of Canterbury, with the purpose of recruiting for the Third Crusade. The Itinerarium, a narrative account of that tour, was completed in 1191, and the Descriptio was begun almost immediately afterwards. He included three substantial quotations from the earlier work in the Descriptio, as well as several passages from his first compositions, the Topographia Hibernica and the Expugnatio Hibernica.

The Descriptio exists in two, or arguably three, versions. The first of these, completed in 1193 or early 1194 and dedicated to Hubert Walter, Archbishop of Canterbury, survives in many manuscripts, and has been edited from the earliest three:

V. British Library, Cotton, Vitellius C.X.
N. British Library, Cotton, Nero D.VIII.
Rc. British Library, Bib. Reg., 13C.111.

Of these, V and N are believed to be independent copies of a lost manuscript, and Rc to be a poor copy of V. Gerald presented a manuscript of this first version to Hugh of Avalon, Bishop of Lincoln, and illustrated it with a map of Wales. This copy is known to have survived as late as 1691, but is now lost, probably a victim of the Westminster Abbey fire of 1694.

Gerald produced a lightly revised version of his work in early 1215, and presented it to Stephen Langton, Archbishop of Canterbury. This version survives in one manuscript:

D. British Library, Cotton, Domitian A.I.

There is also one more manuscript:

Rd. British Library, Bib. Reg. 13B.XII

This has very minor differences from the text of D at four points. It is treated as a manuscript of the second version by James F. Dimock, but as a third version by Lewis Thorpe.

== Reception ==
The Descriptio’s objectivity in its presentation of the Welsh has been the subject of much scholarly disagreement. Its "extreme impartiality" was asserted by H. E. Butler, and denied by Meic Stephens; Brynley F. Roberts thought that Gerald's Welsh sympathies are unmistakable, while Michael Faletra saw the book as slanted against the Welsh, attributing to them virtues more trivial than their vices and giving them military advice much less practical than the advice he gave to the Anglo-Normans.

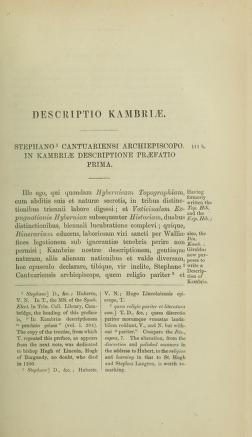
The first page of the Descriptio in James Dimock's edition.

Sean Davies argued that the use of thesis and antithesis in the two-book structure of the Descriptio, presenting two sharply opposed views of the Welsh, was intended by Gerald as a display of his mastery of classical rhetorical forms, and that this vitiates the usefulness of the work as a historical source, since he might have been exaggerating differences for literary effect. Brynley F. Roberts agreed that it has to be used with care, but nevertheless believed it to represent "Gerald at his disciplined best as a writer", its brevity being the mark of its discipline and careful construction. He saw this, together with the interest of the subject matter and the warmth of the author's personality, as being the factors that made the Descriptio Cambriae and the Itinerarium Cambriae the most popular of Gerald's works.

James Dimock felt that the Descriptio benefits greatly from being written on a subject that could not, as several of his works did, evoke any of his prejudices or personal animosities. The result, he judged, could stand as a "very honourable comparison with any topographical attempt that had appeared up to his time, and with any that appeared for many ages afterwards…[T]his treatise is one of the best specimens of his best style." Robert Bartlett further stressed the originality of the Descriptio, in which, he said, Gerald had "virtually reinvented the ethnographic monograph, a genre that had largely lapsed since antiquity". Shirin Khanmohamadi, entirely agreeing with this verdict, saw Gerald's rediscovery of this form as being prompted by his belief that Welsh culture was under threat from Anglo-Norman colonialism. It was, in fact, a form of salvage anthropology, and also an early example of autoethnography, the study of the writer’s own culture in idioms drawn both from that culture's natives and from its colonizers or metropolitan outsiders. On the other hand Michael Faletra saw the work as a resource intended to be exploited by the colonial powers as an aid to administering the conquered parts of Wales. Meic Stephens considered it "of the utmost value to social historians", and pointed out the importance of the final passage, which brings in the old man of Pencader: his "defiant but dignified answer is one of the classic statements of Welsh nationhood." Phil Carradice believed the Itinerarium and the Descriptio had set the tone for all travel-writing from Gerald's day to our own, giving the writer's own opinions equal prominence with the simple facts.

== Editions ==
Between 1585 and 1804 four more or less unsatisfactory editions of the Descriptio were published. The only critical edition is James F. Dimock (ed.) Giraldi Cambrensis opera. Vol. VI. Itinerarium Kambriae et Descriptio Kambriae. Rolls Series. (London, 1868).

== Translations ==
In 1806 translations by Sir Richard Colt Hoare of both the Descriptio Cambriae and the Itinerarium Cambriae were published. In 1861 both were revised by the antiquary Thomas Wright, and included in a volume of The Historical Works of Giraldus Cambrensis, published as part of Bohn's Antiquarian Library. The Hoare translations were reissued in Everyman's Library in 1908, and again reprinted in 1968 by AMS Press. The more recent translations by Lewis Thorpe, The Journey Through Wales and The Description of Wales, were published by Penguin Classics in 1978, ISBN 0140443398
