= Gerald of Wales =

Welsh clergyman and writer (c. 1146–1223)

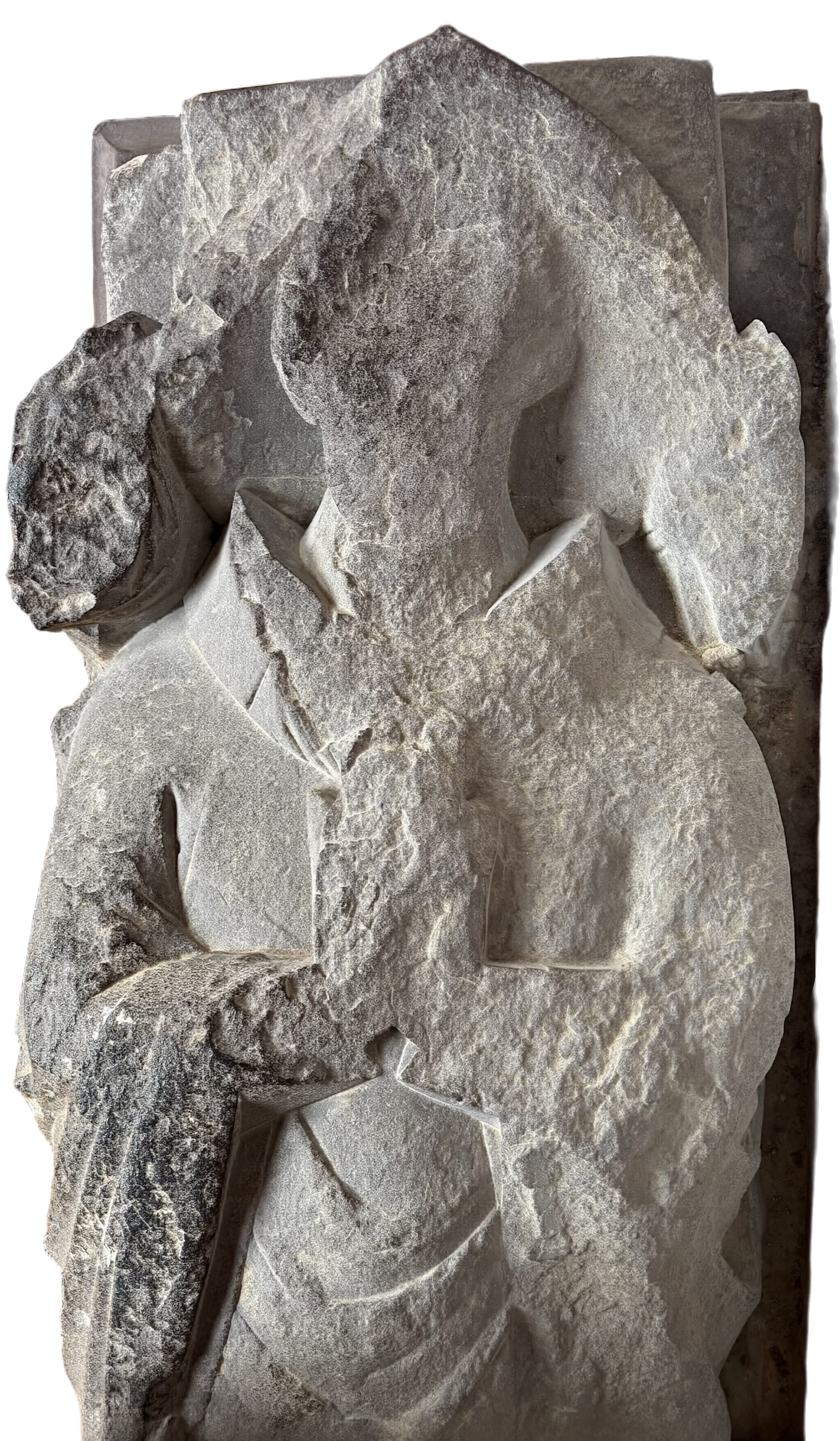
- Gerald's grave in St Davids Cathedral
- Born: Gerald de Barri c. 1146; Manorbier Castle, Pembrokeshire, Wales
- Died: c. 1223 (aged about 77) probably Hereford, England
- Education: University of Paris
- Occupation: Clergyman
- Writing career
- Language: Latin
- Notable works: Topographia Hibernica; Expugnatio Hibernica; Itinerarium Cambriae; Descriptio Cambriae; De principis instructione

Gerald of Wales (Latin: Giraldus Cambrensis; Welsh: Gerallt Gymro; French: Gerald de Barri; c. 1146 – c. 1223) was a Cambro-Norman priest and historian. As a royal clerk to the king and two archbishops, he travelled widely and wrote extensively. He studied and taught in France and visited Rome several times, meeting the Pope. He was nominated for several bishoprics but turned them down in the hope of becoming Bishop of St Davids, but was unsuccessful despite considerable support. His final post was as Archdeacon of Brecon, from which he retired to academic study for the remainder of his life.

Gerald wrote on a variety of topics; his works on Ireland and Wales, which contain details on the culture, contemporary life, and history of those countries, are generally considered the most distinguished. Much of his writing survives.

== Life ==
=== Early life ===
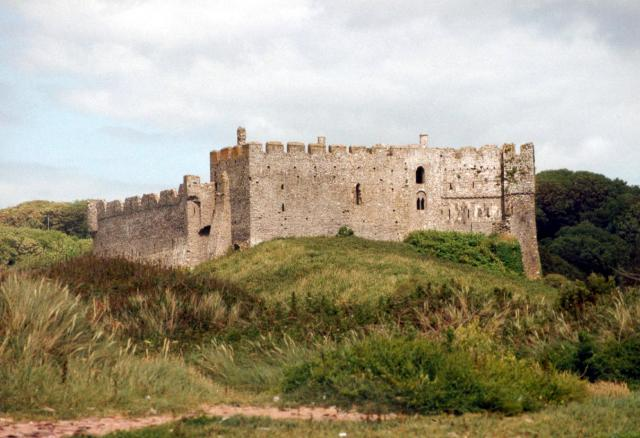
Manorbier Castle, birthplace of Gerald of Wales

Born c. 1146 at Manorbier Castle in Pembrokeshire, Wales, Gerald was of mixed Norman and Welsh descent. Gerald was the youngest son of William Fitz Odo de Barry (or Barri), the common ancestor of the de Barry family of Barry, Glamorganshire, who subsequently invaded Ireland, a retainer of Arnulf de Montgomery and Gerald de Windsor, and one of the most powerful Anglo-Norman barons in Wales. His mother was Angharad FitzGerald, a daughter of Gerald FitzWalter of Windsor, Constable of Pembroke Castle, and his wife Nest ferch Rhys, daughter of Rhys ap Tewdwr, King of Deheubarth, making Gerald the king's great grandson. Through his mother, Gerald was also a nephew of David FitzGerald, Bishop of St Davids, as well as a great-nephew of Gruffydd ap Rhys, the son and heir of Rhys ap Tewdwr, and a cousin of Rhys ap Gruffydd, the famous Arglwydd (Lord) Rhys and his family.

Gerald received his initial education at the Benedictine house of Gloucester, followed by a period of study in Paris from c. 1165–74, where he studied the trivium. He was employed by Richard of Dover, the Archbishop of Canterbury, on various ecclesiastical missions in Wales, and distinguished himself by his efforts to remove supposed abuses of consanguinity and tax laws flourishing in the Welsh church at the time. He was appointed in 1174 as Archdeacon of Brecon, to which was attached a residence at Llanddew. He obtained this position by reporting the existence of the previous archdeacon's mistress; the man was promptly dismissed. While administering this post, Gerald collected tithes of wool and cheese from the populace; the income from the archdeaconry supported him for many years.

Upon the death of his uncle, the Bishop of St Davids, in 1176, the chapter nominated Gerald as his successor. St Davids had the long-term aim of becoming independent of Canterbury, and the chapter may have thought that Gerald was the man to take up its cause. King Henry II of England, fresh from his struggle with Archbishop Thomas Becket, promptly rejected Gerald in favour of Peter de Leia, one of his Norman retainers, possibly because Gerald's Welsh blood and ties to the ruling family of Deheubarth made him seem like a troublesome prospect. According to Gerald, the king said at the time: "It is neither necessary nor expedient for king or archbishop that a man of great honesty or vigour should become Bishop of St Davids, for fear that the Crown and Canterbury should suffer thereby. Such an appointment would only give strength to the Welsh and increase their pride." The chapter acquiesced in the decision, and Gerald, disappointed with the result, withdrew to the University of Paris. From c. 1179-8, he studied and taught canon law and theology. He returned to England and spent an additional five years studying theology. In 1180, he received a minor appointment from the Bishop of St Davids, which he soon resigned.

=== Travels ===
Gerald became a royal clerk and chaplain to King Henry II of England in 1184, first acting as a mediator between the crown and Prince Rhys ap Gruffydd. He was chosen to accompany one of the king's sons, John, in 1185 on John's first expedition to Ireland. This was the catalyst for his literary career; his work Topographia Hibernica (first circulated in manuscript in 1188, and revised at least four times) is an account of his journey to Ireland; Gerald always referred to it as his Topography, though "history" is the more accurate term.

He followed it up, shortly afterwards, with an account of Henry's conquest of Ireland, the Expugnatio Hibernica. Both works were revised and added to several times before his death, and display a notable degree of Latin learning, as well as a great deal of prejudice against foreign people. Gerald was proud to be related to some of the Norman invaders of Ireland, such as his maternal uncle Robert FitzStephen and Raymond FitzGerald, and his influential account, which portrays the Irish as barbaric savages, gives important insight into Cambro-Norman views of Ireland and the history of the invasion.

Having thus demonstrated his usefulness, Gerald was selected to accompany the Archbishop of Canterbury, Baldwin of Forde, on a tour of Wales in 1188, the object being a recruitment campaign for the Third Crusade. His account of that journey, the Itinerarium Cambriae (1191) was followed by the Descriptio Cambriae in 1194.

His two works on Wales remain very valuable historical documents, useful for their descriptions (however untrustworthy and inflected by ideology, whimsy, and his unique style) of Welsh and Norman culture. It is uncertain whether Gerald was a Welsh speaker; although he quotes Welsh proverbs and appears familiar with the language, he seems not to have been employed as an interpreter for the expedition.

As a royal clerk, Gerald observed significant political events first-hand and was offered appointments to the bishoprics of Wexford and Leighlin, and apparently, slightly later, the bishopric of Ossory and the archbishopric of Cashel, and later the bishopric of Bangor in Wales; and, in 1191, that of Llandaff. He turned them all down, possibly in the hope of landing a more prominent bishopric in the future. He was acquainted with Walter Map, whose career shares some similarities with Gerald's. Retiring from royal service, he lived in Lincoln from c. 1196 to 1198, when his friend, William de Montibus, was chancellor of the cathedral. In this period, De principis instructione was probably the first written, a useful historical source of contemporary events. It was an influential work at the time, spreading, for example, the legend of MacAlpin's treason. Here, Gerald is frequently critical of the rule of the Angevin kings, a shift from his earlier praise of Henry II in the Topographia. He also wrote a life of St Hugh of Lincoln.

=== Attempts to become bishop of St Davids ===
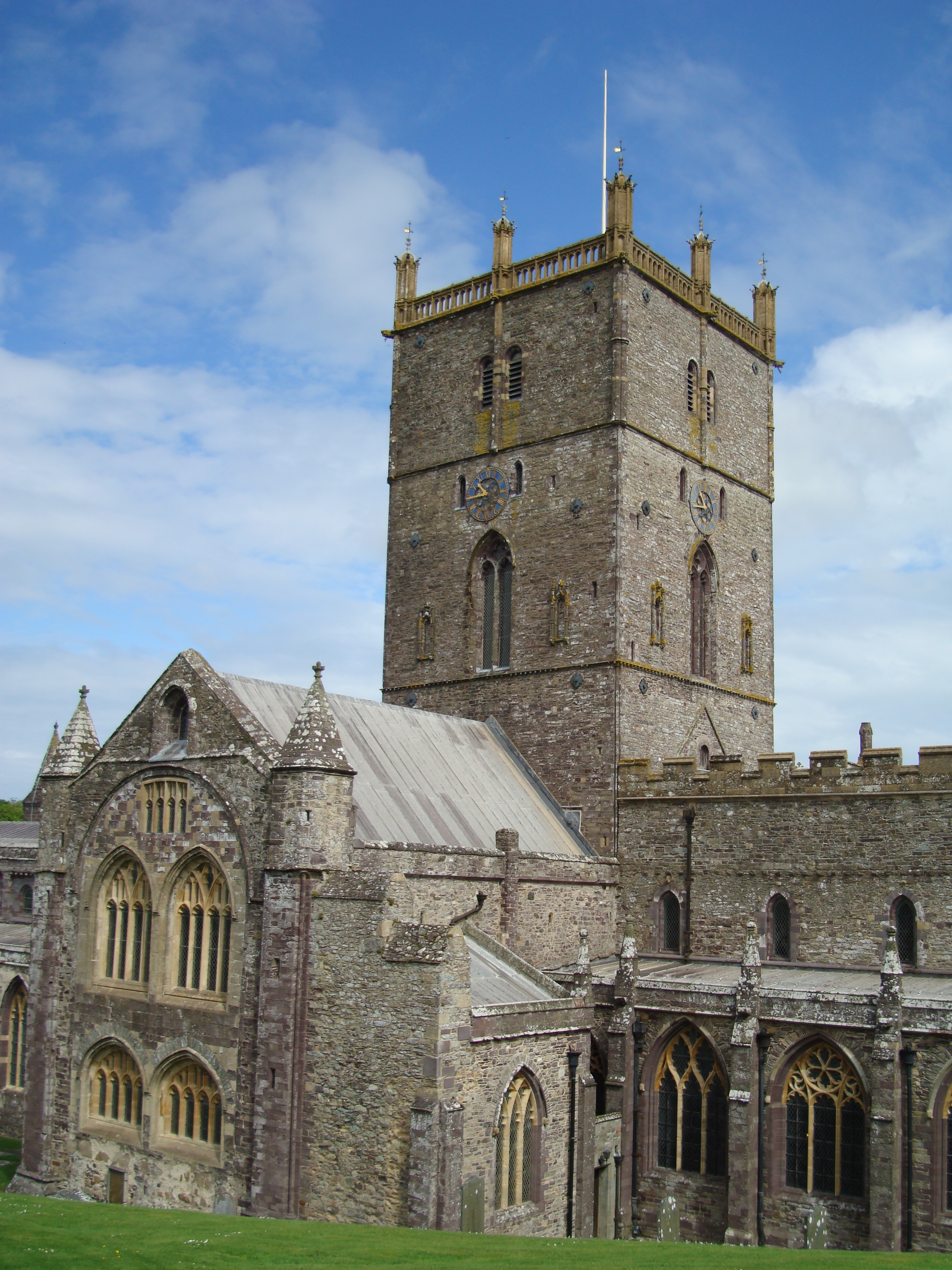
St Davids Cathedral today

On the death of Peter de Leia in 1198, the chapter of St Davids again nominated Gerald for the bishopric, but Hubert Walter, Archbishop of Canterbury, refused confirmation. Representatives of the canons followed Richard I to France, but before they could interview him, he died; his successor, King John, received them kindly and granted them permission to hold an election. They were unanimous in their selection of Gerald, and Gerald acted as bishop-elect for much of the next four years; and, as Hubert still refused to confirm the election, Gerald started for Rome to have his election confirmed. There he had an interview with Pope Innocent III. He visited Rome on three occasions (1199–1200; 1201; 1202–3) in support of his claims. But in 1198, the archbishop had forestalled him, and his agents in Rome undermined Gerald's case; and as the pope was not convinced that St David's was independent of Canterbury, Gerald's mission failed. Gerald had pleaded not only his own cause, but that of St Davids as a Metropolitan archbishopric (and thus of the same status as Canterbury) reviving the earlier claims of Rhygyfarch and Bishop Bernard of St Davids. It was in connexion with this cause that he wrote his books De jure Menevensis Ecclesiâ and De Rebus a Se Gestis. Gerald returned, and his cause was now supported by the Princes of Wales, most notably Llywelyn the Great, and Gruffydd ap Rhys II, while King John, frequently in conflict with the Welsh, warmly espoused the cause of the Archbishop of Canterbury. In 1202, Gerald was accused of stirring up the Welsh to rebellion and was put on trial, but the trial came to nothing as the principal judges were absent. After this long struggle, the chapter of St David's deserted Gerald, and having been obliged to leave Wales, he fled to Rome. The ports had been closed against him, so he travelled in secret. In April 1203 Pope Innocent III annulled both elections, and Geoffrey of Henlaw was appointed to the See of St Davids, despite the strenuous exertions of Gerald. Travelling back to France, he was briefly imprisoned there for these actions. He was afterwards reconciled with the king and was forced to vow never again to support the primacy of St Davids over Canterbury. The expenses of his unsuccessful election were paid by the crown. Gerald maintained his appointment had been prevented by fear of its possible effect on national politics in Wales. He famously complained in a letter to Innocent III, "Because I am a Welshman am I to be debarred from all preferments in Wales? On the same reasoning so would an Englishman in England, a Frenchman in France, and Italian in Italy. But I am sprung from the Princes of Wales and the Barons of the Marches, and when I see injustice in either race I hate it." At this point he resigned his position as archdeacon of Brecon.

=== Later life ===
Gerald spent the remainder of his life in academic study, most probably in Lincoln, producing works of devotional instruction and politics, and revising the works on Ireland and Wales he had written earlier in his life. He spent two years (1204–6) in Ireland with his relatives and made a fourth visit to Rome, purely as a pilgrimage, in 1206. The controversy over St Davids soured his relationship with the crown. In 1216, a baronial plan to put Louis VIII of France on the throne of England in the First Barons' War was warmly welcomed by him. He died in about 1223 in his 77th year, probably in Hereford, and he is, according to some accounts, buried at St Davids Cathedral.

There is a statue, by Henry Poole of Gerald in City Hall, Cardiff, and he was included in the vote on 100 Welsh Heroes for his Descriptio Cambriae and Itinerarium Cambriae. His reputation in Ireland, due to his negative portrayal of the Irish, is much less friendly.

== Works ==
Gerald's writings in good-quality Latin, based on a thorough knowledge of Classical authors, reflect experiences gained on his travels as well as his great knowledge of the standard authorities. He was respected as a scholar in his time and afterwards. The noted scholar Edward Augustus Freeman, in his Norman Conquest, said he was "the father of comparative philology," and in the preface to the last volume of Gerald's works in the Rolls Series, he calls him "one of the most learned men of a learned age," "the universal scholar." His writings were prolific, running to about ten volumes in modern printed editions. Gerald was a man of strong opinions whose works are frequently polemical, including bitter attacks on his enemies, but he also had an intense curiosity, recording much valuable detail of everyday life in his ethnographic works.

It is generally agreed today that his most distinguished works are those dealing with Wales and Ireland, with his two books on his beloved Wales the most important: Itinerarium Cambriae and Descriptio Cambriae which tell us much about Welsh history and geography and reflect on the cultural relationship between the Welsh and the English. Gerald, despite his desire for an independent Welsh Church and admiration for parts of Welsh life, was very loyal to Norman Marcher rule, regarding the Normans as more civilised than the Welsh, a feeling reflected in his writings. Professor Davies tells us that Gerald, whom he calls "an admirable story-teller", is the only source for some of the most famous of the Welsh folk tales including the declaration of the old man of Pencader to Henry II which concludes Descriptio Cambriae:

This nation, O King, may now, as in former times, be harassed, and in a great measure weakened and destroyed by your and other powers, and it will also prevail by its laudable exertions, but it can never be totally subdued through the wrath of man, unless the wrath of God shall concur. Nor do I think that any other nation than this of Wales, nor any other language, whatever may hereafter come to pass, shall on the day of severe examination before the Supreme Judge, answer for this corner of the earth.

It was Gerald who also wrote (of the Welsh) that "If they would be inseparable, they would be insuperable", and that, unlike the English hirelings, who fight for power or to procure gain or wealth, the Welsh patriots fight for their country. He had pleasant things to say about the poetic talents of his people, too:

In their rhymed songs and set speeches they are so subtle and ingenious that they produce, in their native tongue, ornaments of wonderful and exquisite invention both in the words and the sentences... They make use of alliteration in preference to all other ornaments of rhetoric, and that particular kind which joins by consonancy the first letters or syllables of words.

Gerald could not have predicted the later perfection of cynghanedd, the complex system of sound correspondence that has characterised the strict-metre poetry of the Welsh for so many centuries and that is still practised today, especially in competitions for the eisteddfod chair. Cynghanedd did not become a formal system with strict rules until the fourteenth century, but its uniquely Welsh forms had been honed for centuries before that.

Finally, in Descriptio Cambriae, Gerald penned the following words that give so much pride to Welsh singers of today, especially those who participate in the immensely popular cymanfaoedd canu (hymn-singing festivals) held throughout Wales and North America:

In their musical concerts they do not sing in unison like the inhabitants of other countries, but in many different parts... You will hear as many different parts and voices as there are performers, who all at length unite with organic melody.

Another part of the above work, however, is less positive. As Gerald puts it, "an attention to order now requires that, in this second part, we should employ our pen in pointing out those particulars in which it seems to transgress the line of virtue and commendation". David Powel published an abridged version of Itinerarium Cambriae and Descriptio Cambriae in 1585, omitting Gerald's negative comments about the Welsh. Due to translations into English, the first being done by Sir Richard Colt Hoare, Bart., and other translations such as in Everyman's Library and Penguin Classics, Gerald's works on Wales are well known today.

In Gerald's writing on Ireland, his love of music is very evident, too.

Chapter XI of Distinction III (Topographia Hibernica, Of the incomparable skill of the Irish in playing upon musical instruments): The only thing to which I find that this people apply a commendable industry is playing upon musical instruments; in which they are incomparably more skilful than any other nation I have ever seen. For their modulation on these instruments, unlike that of the Britons to which I am accustomed, is not slow and harsh, but lively and rapid, while the harmony is both sweet and gay. It is astonishing that in so complex and rapid a movement of the fingers, the musical proportions can be preserved........ it must be remarked, however, that both Scotland and Wales strive to rival Ireland in the art of music......

Gerald's works on Ireland, although invaluable for their detail, are tremendously biased, and have been extensively criticised by writers such as Stephen White. The following passage from his Topographia Hibernica demonstrates one example of vehement anti-Irish sentiment that reverberates throughout Gerald's works:

Distinction III *Chapter XXXV (Of the number of persons in this nation who have bodily defects): Moreover, I have never seen in any other nation so many individuals who were born blind, so many lame, maimed or having some natural defect. The persons of those who are well-formed are indeed remarkably fine, nowhere better; but as those who are favoured with the gifts of nature grow up exceedingly handsome, those from whom she withholds them are frightfully ugly. No wonder if among an adulterous and incestuous people, in which both births and marriages are illegitimate, a nation out of the pale of the laws, nature herself should be foully corrupted by perverse habits. It should seem that by the just judgements of God, nature sometimes produces such objects, contrary to her own laws, in order that those who will not regard Him duly by the light of their own consciences, should often have to lament their privations of the exterior and bodily gift of sight.

Gerald was a keen and observant student of natural history, but the value of his observations is lessened by credulity and the inability to distinguish fact from legend. He gives a vivid and accurate description of the last colony of the Eurasian beaver in Wales on the Teifi, but spoils it by repeating the legend that beavers castrate themselves to avoid danger. Likewise, he gives a good description of an osprey fishing, but adds the mythical detail that the bird has one webbed foot. His description of Irish wildlife has been the subject of much adverse comment for its inaccuracies and lapses into fiction but nonetheless, despite its faults, some have argued that it gives an important glimpse of Irish fauna in the 1180s. Certainly the book has valuable details about Irish birds: while the common kingfisher is now common in Ireland, Gerald states clearly that it was not found there in his time: on the other hand the white-throated dipper, which he had evidently not seen before, was very common in Ireland. He also observed the great numbers of birds of prey in Ireland, including the golden eagle and the Eurasian sparrowhawk, which he said were more numerous in Ireland than in England.

=== List of works ===
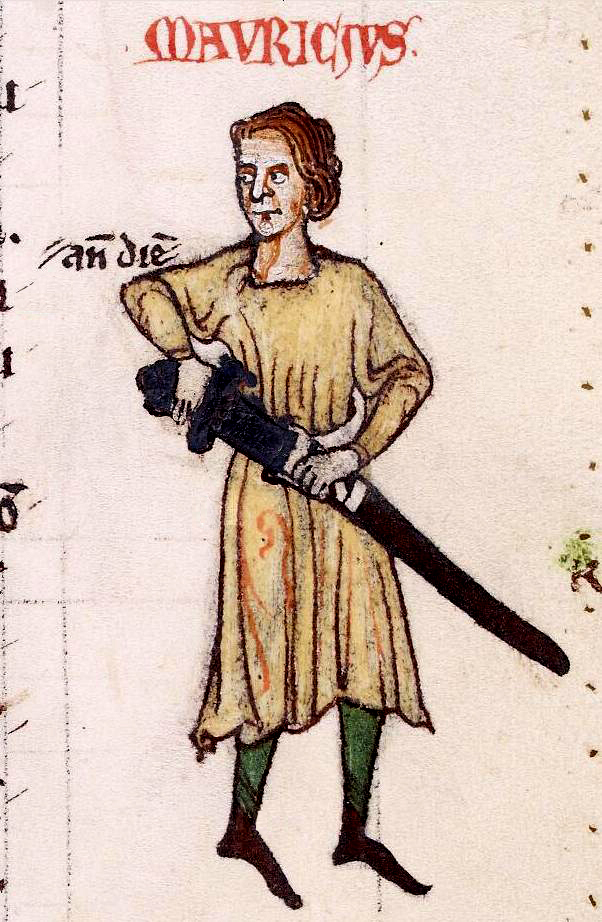
A drawing of Gerald de Barri's uncle, Maurice FitzGerald, Lord of Llanstephan, from a manuscript of the Expugnatio Hibernica

- Topographia Hibernica ("Topography of Ireland", c. 1188)
- Expugnatio Hibernica ("Conquest of Ireland", 1189)
- Itinerarium Cambriae ("Journey through Wales", 1191)
- Descriptio Cambriae ("Description of Wales", 1194)
- De principis instructione ("Education of a prince", first distinction c. 1191, complete work was likely released c. 1216×1217)
- De Rebus a Se Gestis ("On the Things He Has Achieved", autobiographical, c. 1208x1216)
- De Jure et Statu Menevensis Ecclesiae ("Rights and privileges of the Church of St Davids", published anonymously c. 1218)
- Gemma ecclesiastica ("Jewel of the church", c. 1197)
- Speculum ecclesiae ("Mirror of the church")
- Symbolum electorum (Collection of Gerald's compositions, c. 1199)
  - De mundi creatione
- De invectionibus ("On Shameful Attacks", c. 1216)
- Retractationes
- Speculum duorum ("A mirror of two men", c. 1208 – c. 1216)
- Vita Sancti Hugonis (Life of St Hugh of Lincoln, first two books c. 1213, third book c. 1213 – c. 1219)
- Vita Galfridi Archiepiscopi Eboracenis ("Life of Geoffrey", published anonymously c. 1193)
- Vita Sancti Ethelberti ("Life of St Ethelbert", c. 1195)
- Vita Sancti Remigii ("Life of St Remigius", first recension c. 1198 second recension c. 1213)
- Vita Sancti Davidis ("Life of St David" c. 1190x1199)

==== Attributed to Gerald ====
- History of Llanthony Priory (published anonymously)

==== Lost works ====
- Vita sancti Karadoci ("Life of St Caradoc")
- De fidei fructu fideique defectu ("About the fruit of faith and [about] the lack of faith", c. 1205x1215)
- Totius Kambriae mappa ("Map of all Wales", c. 1205)
- De philosophicis flosculis ("The Flowers of Philosophy")
- Cosmographia (c. 1166x1176)
- Chronographia (c. 1166x1176)

==== Online editions ====
- The Historical Works of Giraldus Cambrensis, containing The Topography of Ireland, and the History of the Conquest of Ireland, translated by Thomas Forester, and The Itinerary through Wales, and the Description of Wales, translated by Sir Richard Colt Hoare, 1905

== In popular culture ==
- Gerald's tour of Wales in 1188 was detailed in a 1988 cartoon voiced by comedian Max Boyce.
- Gerald of Wales was 4th in the series of 8 by Nicholas Crane in Great British Journeys.
- James Goldman's novel Myself As Witness is written from Gerald of Wales' point of view, though in the novel he is referred to as Giraldus Cambrensis, which means Gerald of Wales in Latin.
- A train service between Holyhead and Cardiff operated by Transport for Wales Rail is named Gerald of Wales.

== See also ==
- Cambridge University Library, Ff. i.27, a composite manuscript containing some of Gerald of Wales's works such as De Descriptione Hybernie, Expugnatio Hibernica and Vita Sancti Patricii Episcopi
- List of manuscripts of works of Gerald of Wales
- Adam of Usk
- Geoffrey of Monmouth
- Laudabiliter
- Giraldus Cambrensis (c. 1146–c. 1223) of Wales Max Brian Yale Genealogical Collection, 2025.
