= Stephen White (Jesuit) =

Stephen White, SJ (1575–1646) was a Jesuit author and antiquarian who wrote about the early Irish saints.

== Life ==
Stephen White was born in Clonmel, County Tipperary, Ireland, in 1575. In 1592, Trinity College, Dublin was founded, and S. White (in all probability Stephen White) was one of the few students named in the charter. Unwilling to take the Oath of Supremacy, he left his native land and entered the Irish College at Salamanca, Spain, where in 1596 he joined the Society of Jesus, and taught from 1602 to 1606.

From 1606 to 1609 White was professor of Scholastic Philosophy at Ingolstadt. He also held the chair of Theology at Dilingen. He applied himself to the study of history and was generally reputed to be one of the most learned men of his time in Europe. Archbishop Ussher called him a man profoundly versed in the ancient records, not of Ireland alone, but of other countries. His chief interest was in Irish history. To him is due the honour of fixing the historic label "Scotia" to Ireland. He called attention to the treasures of Irish literature preserved in the monasteries and libraries of Germany, and generously supplied many noted scholars, such as Ussher and John Colgan, with accurate copies of Irish manuscripts accompanied by critical emendations and commentaries. It was White who found a copy of Adamnan’s Vita Sancti Columbae ("Life of St. Columba") in a chest in Schaffhausen.

His biographical notices of early Irish saints were utilized in the "Acta SS", and the Bollandists acknowledged the assistance which he gave to Father Heribert Rosweyde. What gave him the bent towards early Irish history seems to have been the publication in Frankfurt by William Camden of two works by Gerald of Wales, which he felt libelled the Irish people. In refutation he wrote his best-known work Apologia pro Hibernia adversus Cambri calumnias, probably written some time before 1615. From 1623 to 1627 he was in the Province of Champagne, and from 1627 to 1629 at the college of Metz.

Around 1629 there was a Jesuit college established in Dublin under the patronage of Lady Elizabeth Kildare, widow of Gerald FitzGerald, 14th Earl of Kildare. Jane Ohlmeyer believes Father White was probably the Superior. The college, however, was after a short time suppressed by the Government, and the property was confiscated and handed over to Trinity College Dublin. For some years he laboured in his native Diocese of Waterford and Lismore, mainly engaged in teaching catechism to children. In 1645 he was Superior of the Jesuit College in Galway where he died.

== Sources ==
- HOGAN, Life of Father Stephen White, S.J. in The Waterford Archaeological Journal, III (1897);
- Reeves, William, Memoir of Stephen White (Royal Irish Academy, 1861)
