= George Frederic Warner =

Sir George Frederic Warner, FBA, FSA (7 April 1845 – 17 January 1936) was an English archivist; he was Keeper of Manuscripts and Egerton Librarian at the British Museum from 1904 to 1911.

== Career ==
Warner was born on 7 April 1845, the son of a solicitor, Isaac Warner, and his wife Susanna (nee Witt). He was educated at Christ's Hospital before going up to Pembroke College, Cambridge, to read classics, graduating in 1868. Three years later, he joined the British Museum's Department of Manuscripts. He was promoted to Assistant Keeper in 1888, and then Keeper of Manuscripts and Egerton Librarian in 1904. He retired from those positions in 1911, and lived out his retirement successively in Beaconsfield, Ealing and Weybridge, before dying on 17 January 1936; his wife, Marian Amelia (née Painter) survived him, as did their daughter, but their son predeceased him.

Warner was a specialist in palaeography (in 1903 he founded the New Palaeographical Society) and illuminated manuscripts. He started A Catalogue of Western Manuscripts in the Old Royal and King's Collections in 1894, although he did not oversee its eventual publication nearly thirty years later. He produced facsimiles for several illuminated manuscripts and a multi-volume set of the British Museum's principal manuscripts. According to F. G. Kenyon, his "most important works of scholarship" were The Buke of John Maundeuill (1889) and The Libell of Englyshe Polycye (1926).

== Honours and awards ==
Warner was awarded with an honorary degree Doctor of Letters (D.Litt.) from the University of Oxford in October 1902, in connection with the tercentenary of the Bodleian Library; he was elected a Fellow of the British Academy (FBA) four years later, and in 1911 he was knighted (the same year that he was elected to an honorary fellowship at Pembroke College). He was also a Fellow of the Society of Antiquaries of London (FSA). In 1922, he was elected a Corresponding Member of the Institut de France.

== Selected publications ==
- Miracles de Nostre Dame: Collected by Jean Miélot, Secretary to Philip the Good, Duke of Burgundy (Nichols & Sons, 1885).
- The Buke of John Maundeuill: Being the Travels of Sir John Mandeville, Knight, 1322–1356 (Nichols & Sons, 1889).
- The Library of James VI, 1573–1583, from a Manuscript in the Hand of Peter Young, his Tutor (T. & A. Constable for the Scottish History Society, 1893).
- The Stowe Missal: MS. D. II. 3 in the library of the Royal Irish Academy, Dublin, 2 vols. (Henry Bradshaw Society, 1893).
- The Voyage of Robert Dudley, Afterwards Styled Earl of Warwick and Leicester and Duke of Northumberland, to the West Indies, 1594–5 (Hakluyt Society, 1899).
- Facsimiles of Ancient Manuscripts, etc. (Oxford University Press for New Palaeographical Society, 1903–12).
- Catalogue of Additions to the Department of Manuscripts, for 1900–05 (British Museum, 1907).
- The Benedictional of St Æthelwold, Bishop of Winchester, 963–984: Reproduced in Facsimile from the Manuscript in the Library of the Duke of Devonshire at Chatsworth (Roxburghe Club, 1910).
- Queen Mary's Psalter: Miniatures and Drawings by an English Artist of the 14th Century, Reproduced from Royal MS. 2 B. VII in the British Museum (British Museum, 1912).
- The Gospels of Matilda, Countess of Tuscany, 1055–1115: Nineteen Plates in Gold and Colour and Twelve in Monochrome from the Manuscript in the Library of John Pierpont Morgan (Roxburghe Club, 1917)
- The Libell of Englyshe Polycye: A Poem on the Use of Sea-power, 1436 (Clarendon Press, 1926).
- The Guthlac Roll: Scenes from the Life of St. Guthlac of Crowland by a Twelfth-century Artist Reproduced from Harley Roll Y. 6 in the British Museum (Roxburghe Club, 1928).

== Likenesses ==
- Sir George Frederic Warner by Walter Stoneman (bromide print, 1917). National Portrait Gallery, London (NPG x185924).
