= Itinerarium Cambriae =

Medieval account of a journey made by Gerald of Wales

The Itinerarium Cambriae ("The Itinerary Through Wales") is a medieval account of a journey made by Gerald of Wales, written in Latin.

Gerald was selected to accompany the Archbishop of Canterbury, Baldwin of Forde, on a tour of Wales in 1188, the object being a recruitment campaign for the Third Crusade. His account of that journey, the Itinerarium Cambriae (1191) (later followed by the Descriptio Cambriae in 1194) remains a very valuable historical document, significant for the descriptions – however untrustworthy and inflected by ideology, whimsy, and his unique style – of Welsh and Norman culture.

Gerald's biases, according to W. Llewelyn Williams, were well balanced. He writes that in the Itinerarium, and its companion Descriptio, Gerald was "impartial in his evidence, and judicial in his decisions. If he errs at all, it is not through racial prejudice. 'I am sprung,' he once told the Pope in a letter, 'from the princes of Wales and from the barons of the Marches, and when I see injustice in either race, I hate it.'"

Manuscript copies of the text are held by the British Library, Bodleian Library, and the University Library, Cambridge. The British Library manuscript has some large coloured foliate initials.

The work plays a role in the plot of Thomas Love Peacock's 1831 novel Crotchet Castle, where the medieval enthusiast Mr. Chainmail proposes to retrace the steps of "Giraldus de Barri".
