= Topographia Hibernica =

12th-century written work by Gerald of Wales

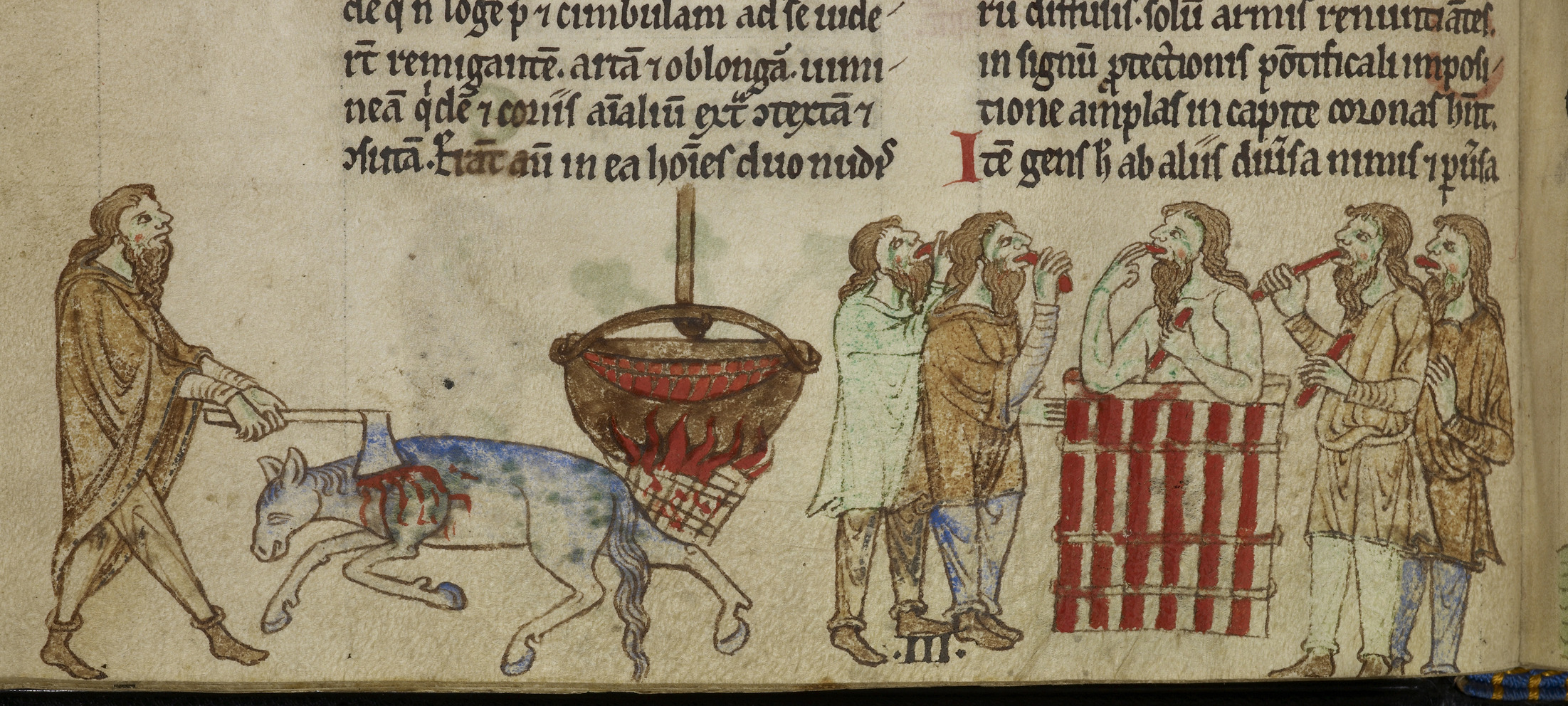
An Irish kingship ritual, from British Library Royal MS 13 B VIII, c. 1220

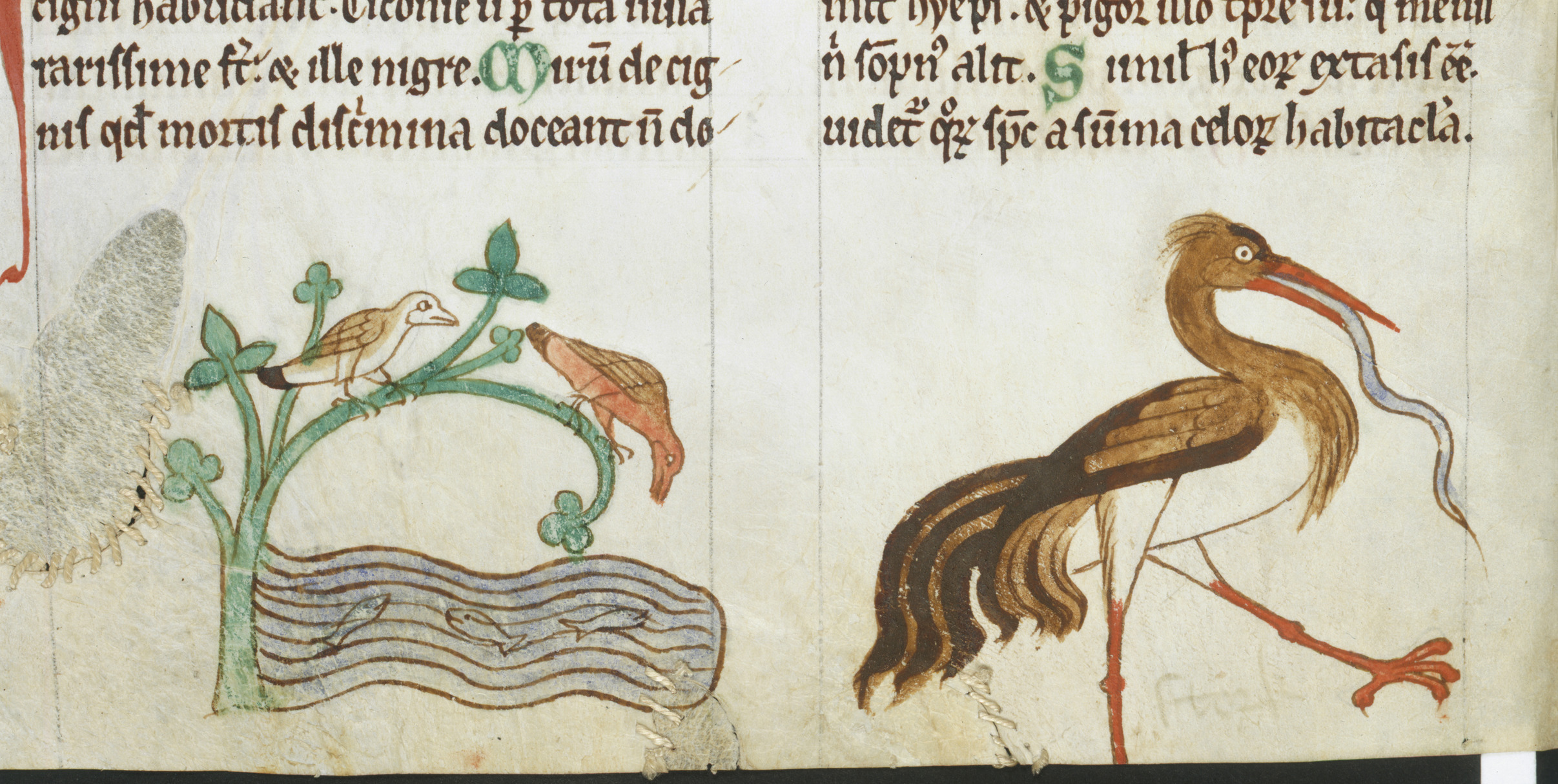
Kingfishers and a stork, from British Library Royal MS 13 B VIII, c. 1220

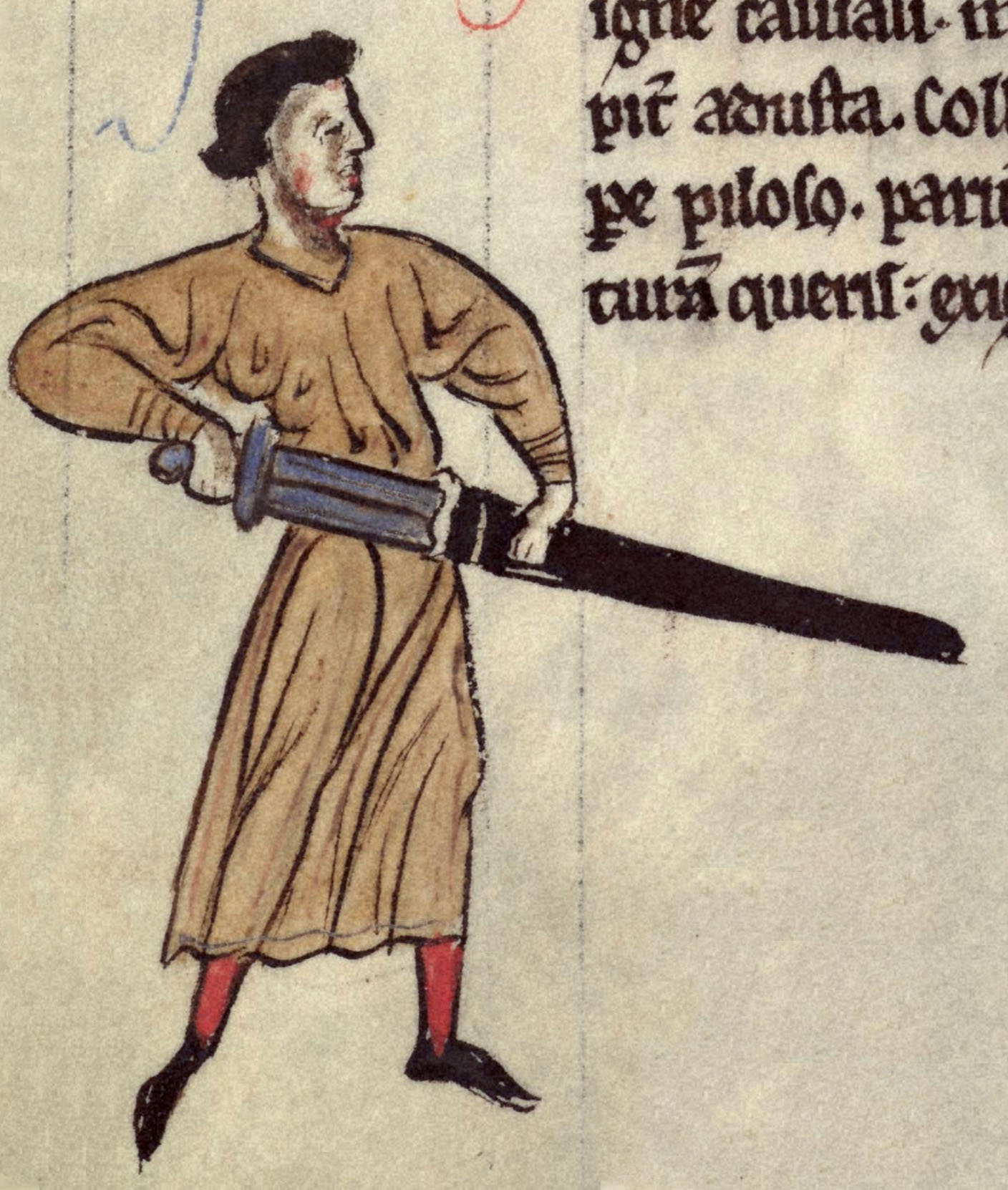
Hugh de Lacy, Lord of Meath, by Gerald of Wales

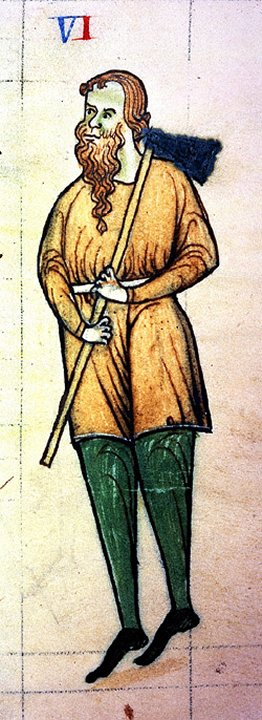
Diarmaid mac Murchadha as depicted in the Expugnatio Hibernica, c. 1189

Topographia Hibernica (Latin for Topography of Ireland), also known as Topographia Hiberniae, is an account of the landscape and people of Ireland written by Gerald of Wales around 1188, soon after the Norman invasion of Ireland. It was the longest and most influential work on Ireland circulating in the Middle Ages, and its direct influence endured into the early modern period.

== Background ==
The author was born about 1146 within the aristocratic FitzGerald/de Barri family in Manorbier Castle in Wales with the birth name of Gerald de Barri. Gerald made his first visit to Ireland in 1183 and returned in 1185. His first visit, to see members of his family who had played a prominent role in the Angevin invasion of the country in 1169, was not more than a year long. His second visit was undertaken at the command of King Henry II, in the company of the king's youngest son, Prince John, and lasted from 25 April 1185 to Easter 1186.

All of his writings were in Latin and have been translated into English. Based on the evidence of the Topographia, it would appear that Gerald's travels within Ireland were not extensive. He spent most of this first visit in Waterford and Cork. During his second visit, he visited Dublin, Wicklow, Meath, Kildare and, possibly, Athlone and Lough Derg. Whether or not he visited some of the places he mentioned or he simply related tales he heard from others is debatable. He wrote about the island of Inishglora, off the coast of the Mullet Peninsula, Erris, that corpses on that island do not putrefy and that generations of people all in a state of perpetual 'freshness' were to be seen on that island.

== Text ==
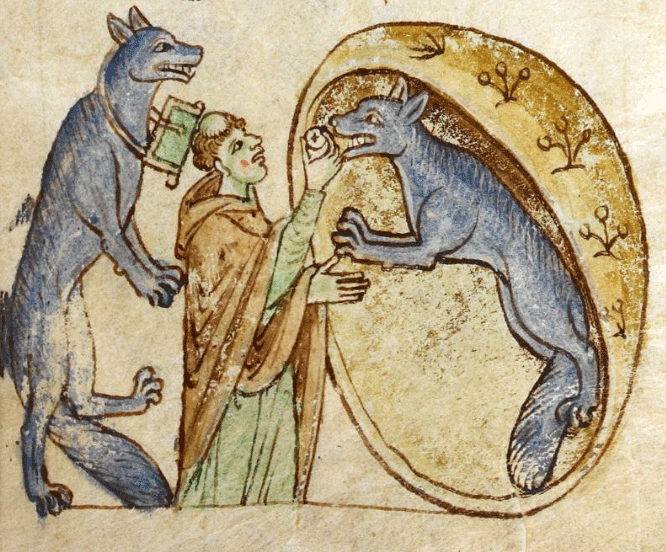
An illustration depicting the story of a travelling priest who meets and communes with a pair of good werewolves from the Kingdom of Ossory. From British Library Royal MS 13 B VIII.

The work is divided into three parts. The first primarily deals with the landscape, flora and fauna of the country; the second with the miracles and marvels of Ireland and the third with the history of the people and their culture.

The work reflects the breadth of Gerald's learning and interests. He claims to have based his book primarily on his own observations and on reliable eyewitness testimony rather than on written sources. Among the few written works that he used was the Irish Lebor Gabála Érenn.

=== Quotations ===
Distinction I (Of the situation in Ireland)

Chapter XI Of barnacles, which grow from fir timber, and their nature

- "There are likewise here many birds called barnacles (barnacle geese) which nature produces in a wonderful manner, out of her ordinary course. They resemble the marsh-geese, but are smaller. Being at first, gummy excrescenses from pine-beams floating on the waters, and then enclosed in shells to secure their free growth, they hang by their beaks, like seaweeds attached to the timber. Being in progress of time well covered with feathers, they either fall into the water or take their flight in the free air, their nourishment and growth being supplied, while they are bred in this very unaccountable and curious manner, from the juices of the wood in the sea-water. I have often seen with my own eyes more than a thousand minute embryos of birds of this species on the seashore, hanging from one piece of timber, covered with shells, and, already formed. No eggs are laid by these birds after copulation, as is the case with birds in general; the hen never sits on eggs to hatch them; in no corner of the world are they seen either to pair or to build nests. Hence, in some parts of Ireland, bishops and men of religion make no scruple of eating these birds on fasting days, as not being flesh, because they are not born of flesh, But these men are curiously drawn in error. For, if anyone had eaten part of the thigh of our first parent, which was really flesh although not born of flesh I should think him not guiltless of having eaten flesh. Repent, O unhappy Jew, recollect, though late, that man was first generated from clay without being procreated by male and female; nor will your veneration for the law allow you to deny that. In the second place, woman was generated of the man, without the intervention of the other sex. The third mode of generation only by male and female, as it is the ordinary one, obstinate as you are, you admit and approve. But the fourth, from which alone came salvation, namely, birth from a woman, without union with a man, you utterly reject with perverse obstinacy, to your own perdition. Blush, O wretched man, blush! At least recur to nature, which in confirmation of the faith for our best teaching, continually produces and gives birth to new animals without union of male and female. The first creature was begotten of clay; this last is engendered of wood. The one, proceeding from the God of nature for once only, was a stupendous miracle; the other, though not less admirable, is less to be wondered at, because imitative nature often performs it. But, human nature is so constituted, that it holds nothing to be precious and admirable but what is uncommon and of rare occurrence. The rising and setting of the sun, than which there is nothing in the world more beautiful, nothing more fit to excite our wonder, we pass by without any admiration, because they are daily present to our eyes; while an eclipse of the sun fills the whole world with astonishment, because it rarely occurs. The procreation of bees from the honeycomb, by some mysterious inspiration of the breath of life, appears to be a fact of the same kind (as the origin of barnacles)"

Distinction II (Of the wonders and miracles of Ireland)

"Chapter XII Of an island which at first floated, and afterwards was firmly fixed by means of fire.

- "Among the other islands is one newly formed, which they call the phantom isle, which had its origin in this manner. One calm day, a large mass of earth rose to the surface of the sea, where no land had ever been seen before, to the great amazement of the islanders who observed it. Some of them said that it was a whale, or other immense sea-monster; others remarking that it continued motionless, said, "No, it is land". In order therefore to reduce their doubts to certainty, some picked young men of the island determined to approach near the spot in a boat. When however, they came so near to it that they thought they should go on shore, the island sank in the water and entirely vanished from sight. The next day it re-appeared, and again mocked the same youths with the like delusion. At length, upon their rowing towards it on the third day, they followed the advice of an older man and let fly an arrow, barbed with red-hot steel, against the island; and then landing, found it stationary and habitable. This adds one of many proofs that fire is the greatest of enemies to every sort of phantom; insomuch that those who have seen apparitions fall into a swoon as soon as they are sensible of the brightness of fire. For fire, both from its position and nature is the noblest of elements, being a witness of the secrets of the heavens. the sky is fiery; the planets are fiery; the bush burnt with fire, but was not consumed; the Holy Ghost sat upon the apostles in tongues of fire". The reader here must wonder if Gerald got, not only to the far western islands of Ireland, but as far as Iceland where he witnessed (or heard about) the (volcanic) birth of an island 'born' in the 12th century (like an early Surtsey!)

" Chapter XX Of a woman who had a beard, and a hairy crest and mane on her back

- "Duvenald, king of Limerick, had a woman with a beard down to her navel, and also, a crest like a colt of a year old, which reached from the top of her neck down her backbone, and was covered with hair. The woman, thus remarkable for two monstrous deformities, was, however, not an hermaphrodite, but in other respects had the parts of a woman; and she constantly attended the court, an object of ridicule as well as of wonder. The fact of her spine being covered with hair, neither determined her gender to be male or female; and in wearing a long beard she followed the customs of her country, though it was unnatural in her. Also, within our time, a woman was seen attending the court in Connaught, who partook of the nature of both sexes, and was an hermaphrodite. On the right side of her face she had a long and thick beard, which covered both sides of her lips to the middle of her chin, like a man; on the left, her lips and chin were smooth and hairless, like a woman"

" Chapter LII (Of the mill which no women enter)

- "There is a mill at Foure, in Meath, which St. Fechin made most miraculously with his own hands, in the side of a certain rock. No women are allowed to enter either this mill or the church of the saint; and the mill is held in as much reverence by the natives as any of the churches dedicated to the saint. It happened that when Hugh de Lacy was leading his troops through this place, an archer dragged a girl into the mill and there violated her. Sudden punishment overtook him; for being struck with infernal fire in the offending parts, it spread throughout his whole body, and he died the same night".

Distinction III (On the inhabitants of this country)

"Of the character, customs and habits of this people"

- Chapter X "I have considered it not superfluous to give a short account of the condition of this nation, both bodily and mentally; I mean their state of cultivation, both interior and exterior. This people are not tenderly nursed from their birth, as others are; for besides the rude fare they receive from their parents, which is only just sufficient for their sustenance, as to the rest, almost all is left to nature. They are not placed in cradles, or swathed, nor are their tender limbs either formented by constant bathings, or adjusted with art. For the midwives make no use of warm water, nor raise their noses, nor depress the face, nor stretch the legs; but nature alone, with very slight aids from art, disposes and adjusts the limbs to which she has given birth just as she pleases. As if to prove that what she is able to form, she does not cease to shape also, she gives growth and proportions to these people, until they arrive at perfect vigour, tall and handsome in person, and with agreeable and ruddy countenances. But although they are richly endowed with the gifts of nature, their want of civilisation, shown both in their dress and mental culture makes them a barbarous people. For they wear but little woollen, and nearly all they use is black, that being the colour of the sheep in all this country. Their clothes are also made after a barbarous fashion.
- Their custom is to wear small, close-fitting hoods, hanging below the shoulders a cubit's length, and generally made of parti-coloured strips sewn together. Under these, they use woollen rugs instead of cloaks, with breeches and hose of one piece or hose and breeches joined together, which are usually dyed of some colour. Likewise, in riding, they neither use saddles, nor boots, nor spurs, but only carry a rod in their hand, having a crook at the upper end, with which they both urge forward and guide their horses. They use reins which serve the purpose both of a bridle and a bit, and do not prevent the horses from feeding, as they always live on grass. Moreover, they go into battle without armour, considering it a burthen (burden) and esteeming it brave and honourable to fight without it.
- But, they are armed with three kinds of weapons: namely, short spears and two darts; in which they follow the customs of the Basclenses (Basques); and they also carry heavy battle axes of iron, exceedingly well-wrought and tempered. These they borrowed from the Norwegians and Ostmen of when we shall speak hereafter. But in striking with the battle-axe they use only one hand, instead of both, clasping the haft firmly, and raising it above the head, so as to direct the blow with such force that neither the helmets which protect our head, nor the platting of the coat of mail which defends the rest of our bodies, can resist the stroke. Thus, it has happened in my own time, that one blow of the axe has cut off a knight's thigh, although it was encased in iron, the thigh and leg falling on one side of his horse, and the body of the dying horseman on the other. When other weapons fail, they hurl stones against the enemy in battle with such quickness and dexterity, that they do more execution than the slingers of any other nation.
- The Irish are a rude people, subsisting on the produce of their cattle only, and living themselves like beasts – a people that has not yet departed from the primitive habits of pastoral life. In the common course of things, mankind progresses from the forest to the field, from the field to the town and to the social conditions of citizens; but this nation, holding agricultural labour in contempt, and little coveting the wealth of towns, as well as being exceedingly averse to civil institutions – lead the same life their fathers did in the woods and open pastures, neither willing to abandon their old habits or learn anything new. They, therefore, only make patches of tillage; their pastures are short of herbage; cultivation is very rare and there is scarcely any land sown. This want of tilled fields arises from the neglect of those who should cultivate them; for theirs are large tracts which are naturally fertile and productive. The whole habits of the people are contrary to agricultural pursuits, so that the rich glebe is barren for want of husbandmen, the fields demanding labour which is not forthcoming.
- Very few sorts of fruit-trees are found in this country, a defect arising not from the nature of the soil, but from want of industry of planting them; for the lazy husbandman does not take the trouble to plant the foreign sorts which would grow very well here. Two of them are fruit-bearing trees, the chestnut and the beech; the other two, the arulus (or alarus – unsure of variety) and the box, though they bear no fruit, are serviceable for making cups and handles. Yews, with their bitter sap, are more frequently to be found in this country than in any other I have visited, but you will see them principally in old cemeteries and sacred places, where they were planted in ancient times by the hands of holy men to give them what ornament and beauty they could. The forests of Ireland also abound with fir-trees, producing frankincense and incense. There are also veins of various kinds of metals ramifying in the bowels of the earth, which, from the same idle habits, are not worked and turned to account. Even gold, which the people require in large quantities and still covet in a way that speaks their Spanish origin, is brought here by the merchants who traverse the ocean for the purposes of commerce. They neither employ themselves in the manufacture of flax or wool or in any kind of trade or mechanical art; but abandoning themselves to idleness, and immersed, in sloth, their greatest delight is to be exempt from toil, their richest possession, the enjoyment of liberty.
- This people then, is truly barbarous, being not only barbarous in their dress but suffering their hair and beards to grow enormously in an uncouth manner, just like the modern fashion recently introduced; indeed, all their habits are barbarisms. But habits are formed by mutual intercourse; and as these people inhabit a country so remote from the rest of the world and lying at its furthest extremity, forming is it were, another world, and are thus excluded from civilised nations, they learn nothing and practise nothing, but the barbarism in which they are born and bred and which sticks to them like a second nature. Whatever natural gifts they possess are excellent, in whatever requires industry they are worthless". All these passages are taken directly from this source

Gerald appears to have added to the work throughout his life with the result that four principal versions of the text have come down to us. The final recension is almost twice as long as the first.

== Reception ==
The work was dedicated to King Henry II in 1187, two years before his death. Soon after King John's accession to the throne, the author published a revised edition, which he dedicated to the new king. The work is known to have been read to Archbishop Baldwin of Exeter by Gerald while both were travelling in Wales to preach the Third Crusade in March 1188. By Gerald's own account, Baldwin thought very highly of the work. It may have been read publicly at Oxford in 1187, and it was certainly read there in sometime around 1188. Gerald notes in his autobiography, De Rebus a se gestis, that he read the work on three successive days, one part of the book being read on each, before a great audience. He claims that the public readings were intended to recall "ancient and authentic times of the poets".

The work enjoyed much wider popularity in manuscript than Gerald's second work on Ireland, the Expugnatio Hibernica. Vernacular translations of the work or of parts of it were produced throughout Europe.

== Influence ==
Gerald's influence was such that even in the 17th century, commentators such as Geoffrey Keating noted that all foreign commentators on Ireland wrote "in imitation of Cambrensis". Among the 16th-century luminaries who were familiar with the work and drew upon it in their own writings were John Leland, John Bale, Abraham Ortelius, Henry Sidney, Philip Sidney, Edmund Campion, Hooker, Holinshed, Hanmer, William Herbert and William Camden. Camden produced the first full printed edition of the work at Frankfurt in 1602.

The text is generally acknowledged to have played a key role in shaping early British attitudes to the Irish.

== Criticism ==
Gerald's depiction of the Irish as savage and primitive was challenged and refuted by a number of Irish writers. The 17th century saw the production of several prominent attacks on Gerald, including Cambrensis Eversus (1662) by John Lynch, and works by Geoffrey Keating, Philip O'Sullivan Beare, and Stephen White.
