= Loveday (1458) =

Arbitration event during the Wars of the Roses

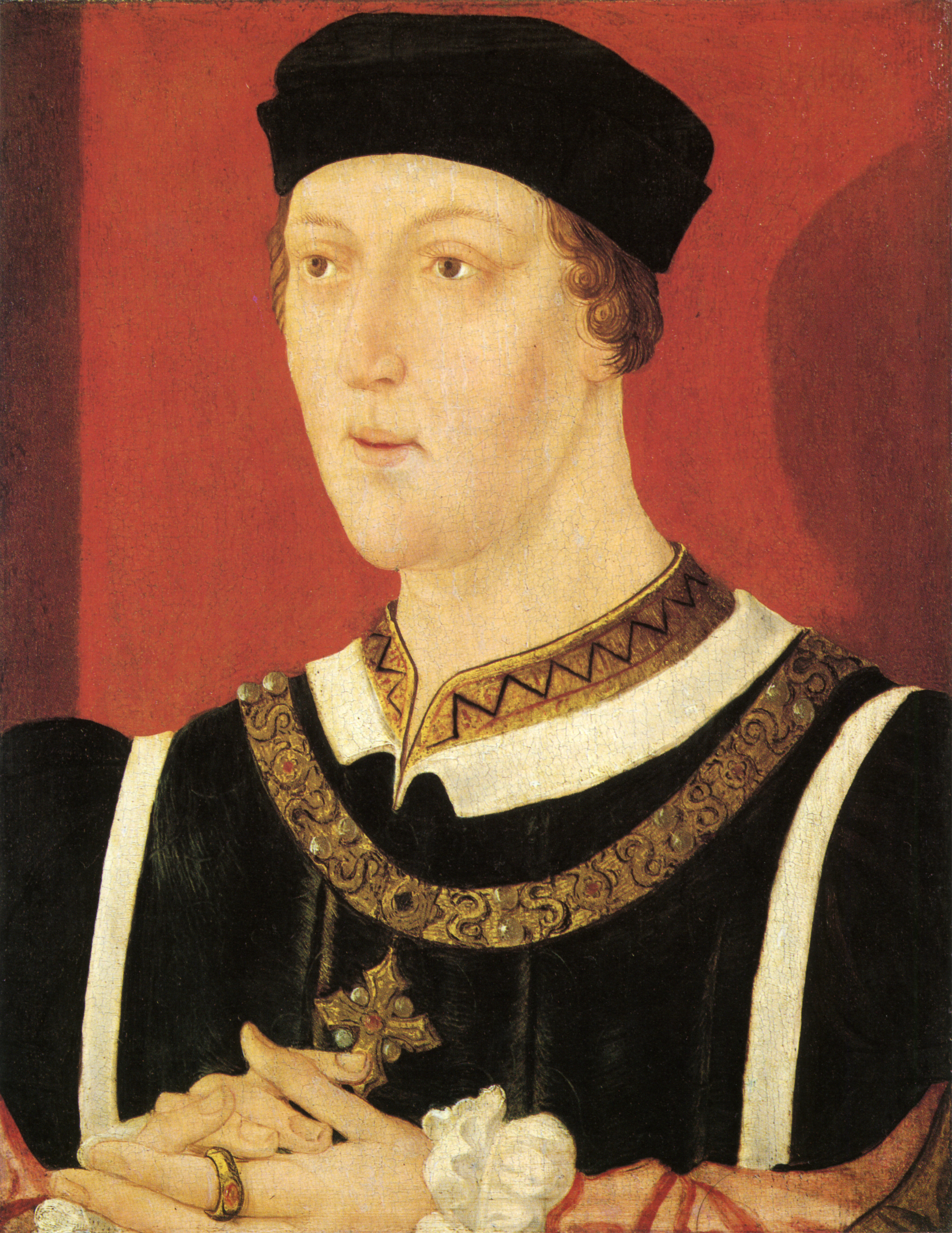
King Henry VI probably organised the Loveday in an attempt to pacify his nobility, which by 1458 had divided down clear partisan lines into armed camps.

A loveday was held at St Paul's Cathedral on 25 March 1458 (Annunciation Day) to ritually reconcile the warring factions of the English nobility. Following the outbreak of the Wars of the Roses in 1455, it was the culmination of lengthy negotiations initiated by King Henry VI to resolve the lords' rivalries. English politics had become increasingly factional during his reign, and the situation was exacerbated in 1453 when the King became catatonic. This effectively left the government leaderless, and eventually the king's cousin, and at the time heir to the throne, Richard, Duke of York, was appointed protector during the king's illness. Alongside York were his allies from the politically and militarily powerful Neville family, led by Richard, Earl of Salisbury, and his eldest son, Richard, Earl of Warwick. When the king returned to health a year later, the protectorship ended but partisanship within the government did not.

Supporters of King Henry and his wife, Queen Margaret, were loosely called "Lancastrians", the king being head of the House of Lancaster, while the duke and his party were considered "Yorkists", after his title of Duke of York. (Note: The labels "York and Lancaster" are, however, considered by historians to oversimplify the complex networks of loyalties and connections by which the English nobility was interlinked. Simply, at the beginning of the Wars of the Roses, the House of Lancaster—whose supporters have been labelled "Lancastrian"—was the ruling, governing dynasty founded by King Henry IV. His primary title had been Duke of Lancaster, and in 1399 he usurped the throne and deposed his cousin, Richard II. The ancestors of the Duke of York accepted the new political paradigm throughout the reign of Henry IV and his son Henry V, as did York himself throughout most of Henry VI's reign. However, Henry VI was both inept as a ruler and manipulable by powerful noble advisors, and they gradually alienated the Duke from central government. Those who gathered around him in opposition to these favourites—and later the king and queen themselves—were known as "Yorkists".) By the 1450s, York felt increasingly excluded from government, and in May 1455—possibly fearing an ambush by his enemies—led an army against the King at the First Battle of St Albans. There, in what has been called more of a series of assassinations than a battle, the personal enemies of York and the Nevilles—the Duke of Somerset, the Earl of Northumberland, and Lord Clifford—perished.

In 1458 the king attempted to unite his feuding nobles with a public display of friendship under the auspices of the Church at St Paul's Cathedral. Following much discussion and negotiation, and amid the presence of large, armed, noble retinues which almost led to another outbreak of war, a compromise was announced. To celebrate, a procession was held by all the major participants, who walked hand-in-hand from Westminster Palace to the cathedral. Queen Margaret was partnered with York, and other adversaries were paired off accordingly, and the sons of the dead Lancastrian lords took their fathers' places. Certain reparations were ordained, all by the Yorkist lords, who for their part accepted full responsibility for the Battle of St Albans. They were ordered to make payments to the dead lords' widows and sons, and masses were paid for the souls of all who had died. Contemporaries varied in their views of the accord. Some wrote verses expressing hope that it would lead to a new-found peace and prosperity; others were more pessimistic as to its value.

In the long run, the king's Loveday and its agreements had no long-lasting benefit. Within a few months, petty violence between the lords had broken out again and, within the year, the Houses of York and Lancaster faced each other at the Battle of Blore Heath. Historians debate who—if anyone—gained from the 1458 Loveday. On the one hand, the crown publicised its role as the ultimate court of appeal but, conversely, although the Yorkists were bound to pay large sums in compensation, this was done with money already owed by the government. Fundamentally, factional discord was highlighted on the public stage, and the war it was intended to prevent was only deferred.

== Political background ==
By the middle of the 15th century, English politics had become increasingly factional. Richard, Duke of York and his Neville allies—Richard, Earl of Salisbury and his son, Richard, Earl of Warwick, with their cousin John Mowbray, Duke of Norfolk—were in opposition to the government of King Henry VI. The king was weak-willed and easily led, and his government was effectively controlled by his favourite, Edmund Beaufort, Duke of Somerset. Further weakening the government, King Henry had become mentally incapacitated in August 1453, becoming comatose, unable to feed himself or recognise any of his companions. (Note: Historians have speculated upon Henry's illness. Its precise nature is unknown, but Griffiths describes it as "a severe mental collapse, accompanied by a crippling physical disablement". Its cause is equally hard to determine. Wolffe speculates that it could have been a response to news of the Battle of Castillon a few days earlier which presaged the final fall of Lancastrian France as well as seeing the death of the English commander, "old Talbot". His illness may also have had a genetic element, as Henry's grandfather, Charles VI of France, had suffered extreme bouts of insanity in his later years.)

At the time, a major feud was taking place in the North of England between the powerful Percy and Neville families. The former was led by Henry Percy, Earl of Northumberland's son, Thomas Percy, Lord Egremont, while the Neville family was headed by Salisbury. In March 1454, the king still being ill, Parliament authorised a protectorate to rule in the king's stead. The House of Lords chose the Duke of York—as the king's closest adult relative—as Protector. York and the Nevilles cemented an alliance during the protectorate when York appointed Salisbury his Lord Chancellor. (Note: Modern historians view Salisbury's appointment as a clear break with tradition. For example, Carpenter describes his appointment as "highly unusual"; while Hicks questions whether Salisbury was the genuinely most suitable candidate available; and Johnson comments that "his selection in such sensitive political circumstances was little short of sensational". Traditionally, the post had been exclusively the preserve of an ecclesiast. The last lay appointment to the office had been that of Sir Thomas Beaufort between 1410 and 1411.) York's protectorate had given the Nevilles a useful advantage over their rivals, and in November 1454, Thomas Percy and his brothers, Henry and Ralph, were captured in battle. They received massive fines. (Note: The defeated Percies were arraigned before a commission of oyer and terminer at York. This commission bound them over for 8,000 marks payable to the Earl of Salisbury, and including fines towards his countess and sons, to a total of 16,800 marks. It was, says Professor Storey, "a staggering sum" which Egremont "could never hope to pay, nor, indeed, did he try". This guaranteed his imprisonment in Newgate. The Percies were too politically favoured for the Nevilles to expect anything other than the king to pardon the Percies for their political offences, whereas they could not hope to avoid the consequences of failing to discharge legally binding debts. The Griffiths has described this as Salisbury's "reckoning" of all the damage caused to his estates during the course of the feud with the Percies. To put these sums in context, Storey has estimated Egremont's annual income to have been less than £100 per annum.) The following January, the king regained his health, and York was no longer required as Protector. York and the Nevilles retreated to their northern estates, and Mowbray did likewise to East Anglia, in an attempt to distance themselves from factional politics. From this point, argues the medievalist A. J. Pollard, power "shifted back into the hands of [York's] enemies, now given a lead by the Queen", Margaret of Anjou, rather than the king.

=== Yorkist demands ===
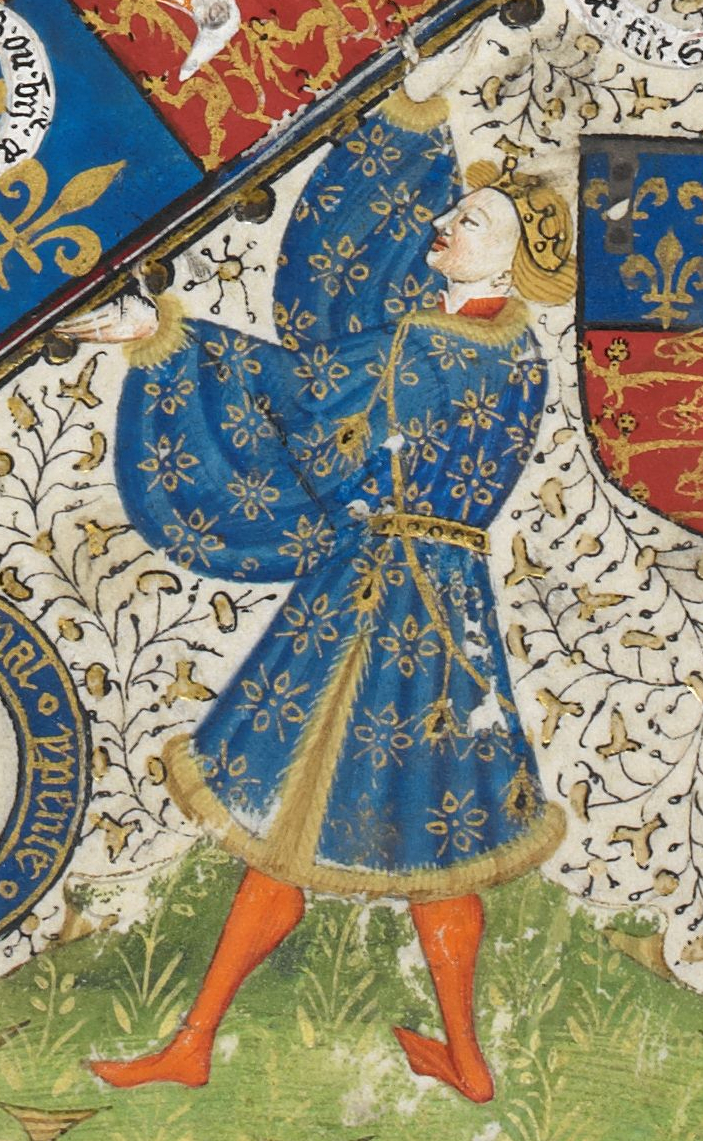
Richard, Duke of York, leader of the Yorkist faction and bitter enemy of the king's favourites, the Dukes of Suffolk and Somerset, who he believed had excluded him from his rightful position in government

An uneasy peace existed between the court and the Yorkists until April 1455, when the king summoned a great council to meet at Leicester the following month. The Duke of York feared that the purpose of this council was to destroy him; several chroniclers of the day suggest that Somerset was influencing the king against the Duke with "subtile meanes". York and the Nevilles raised an army from their northern estates. (Note: The contemporary Abbot of St Albans, John Whethamstede, emphasised the degree to which northerners comprised the Yorkist army in his chronicle.) They wrote to Henry regarding their fears, and emphasised their loyalty to him. This was in spite of what they called the "doubtes and ambiguitees [and] jealousie" spread by their enemies. The Yorkist lords also expressed their fears that their lives were in danger from those who hid "undre the wynge of your Mageste Roiall". This, they said, was the reason they felt the need to travel accompanied by large retinues. The Yorkists' solution was that the king dismiss those who kept the king's true liegemen (i.e., them) from him and that the malicious advisers be excommunicated by the Archbishop of Canterbury.

It is unknown whether the king received the Yorkist lords' letters, although the historian Michael Hicks believes that "there is no convincing evidence" that he did not. Henry and a small force left London for Leicester on 20 May; while it was natural for both the king and his followers to travel with armed contingents, the majority were members of their civil households. (Note: Boardman suggests much of the king's force would have comprised men from his "stables, mews, kitchen and pantry, along with the 'above'–stairs departments of the chapel, hall, wardrobe, counting house and chamber", for example.) The Yorkists approached from the north with a speed calculated to surprise. In a pre-emptive strike, York and his allies intercepted the royal army at St Albans. Fighting in the streets lasted only a short time, and though there were very few fatalities among the common soldiery, the chief Lancastrian captains—Northumberland, Somerset and Thomas, Lord Clifford—were all killed. Not only were they three of the king's most loyal and powerful supporters, but Northumberland and Somerset were bitter enemies of the Nevilles and York. Because of this, the clash has been described more akin to a series of targeted assassinations than a fully fledged battle. On the 22nd, Henry was escorted, under guard, back to London: "all honour was shown to him" by York, Salisbury and Warwick, notes Griffiths, and a ceremony—intending to establish the new-found friendship between the king and the Yorkists—was held in St Paul's the following day.

The period between St Albans and the Loveday, says Pollard, is one of the most poorly recorded of the entire century, although what is known has enabled historians to piece together the basic chronology. By 1458, Henry's government urgently needed to deal with the unfinished problem that the Battle of St Albans had created, summarised by the scholar Ralph A. Griffiths as the "craving of the younger magnates for revenge on those who had killed their fathers". But Henry also wanted to bring the Yorkists back into the fold. Taking the initiative, the Loveday was intended to be his personal contribution to a lasting peace. (Note: Although Watts has suggested otherwise, suggesting that "it was surely the work of [the] council, rather than the whimsy of the king, that the inspiration for the famous Loveday of March 1458 is to be found".) Another motive for achieving a united magnatial front was the French: intelligence had been received suggesting they planned to attack Calais. (Note: Calais, although on the northern coast of France, had been an English possession since 1346. France had ceded Calais to England following the latter's victory at the Battle of Crecy.) In the event, this never occurred, but the previous year the French had been able to land at Sandwich in Kent, which they sacked, taking many prisoners. This alone was reason enough to bring the warring parties together. The Yorkists released an official statement, known as the Parliamentary Pardon, which was intended to absolve them of blame for the crisis. This, as the name suggests, was passed by act of parliament, and was seen as a stronger defence for the Yorkists than one issued by the king alone. (Note: This was not a particularly easy achievement, however; in a letter to John Paston, Henry Windsor said that even in the commons "many a mon groged full sore now it is passed".)

== Lovedays as arbitration ==
In 'loveday', 'love' meant concord or a settlement, and 'day' as a legal term meant a case-opening rather than a twenty-four hour period. There were few, if any restrictions on the kind of business that a loveday could address, as long as the court had authorised it, and this included cases that were pending at a higher court. Arbitration, argues legal historian Anthony Musson, was not a resource restricted to one particular group of people, rather a universal phenomenon, occurring at every level and among all orders of society".

=== Mechanics ===
The ritualistic reconciliations that contemporaries called lovedays have been described by the scholar B. P. Wolffe as "a formal accord on the limited issue of atonement and compensation". (Note: Hicks has argued that medieval Lovedays were similar to the Anglo-Saxon process of wergild.) Legal historian John Baker suggested that, in particularly contentious affairs, a loveday was deliberately designed "to avoid reasoned decision making", being intended to result in voluntary—therefore amicable—settlements. This was regardless of who was legally in the right. The process often had a social aspect to it, such as the parties having to worship or dine together. Lovedays were particularly favoured among the nobility as a mechanism by which parties could avoid the involvement of the crown if they wished. Held in neutral locations agreeable to the protagonists, lovedays were arranged by people acting as the protagonists' councillors. These would be important men in the extra-legal process, says Griffiths: "anyone who talked or wrote about or organized these dies amories was half-way towards settling potentially dangerous quarrels". The protagonists would usually arrive accompanied by small retinues (Note: Keeping the retinue to a minimum was not always respected. At a 1411 loveday between William, Lord Ros and Sir Robert Tirwhit, the former brought his two brothers-in-law, while Tirwhit attended with 500 men. Ros and his relatives escaped and accused Tirwhit of attempting to ambush them.) and await an award from the arbitration committee. This normally comprised three men, trusted by all those involved, and usually members of the local nobility or respected local gentry. Often one of them would be appointed at the beginning of the process as an umpire, in case of a deadlock.

== Preparations and negotiations ==
=== Summoning the lords ===
The Lancastrians were well placed to harry the Yorkists as they made their way to Westminster for the great council. On 1 March, Warwick was warned that Somerset and Northumberland planned to avenge St Albans there and then, but the earl refused to be deterred from attending the council meeting. Some were evidently persuaded only with difficulty to await the king's award.

— R. A. Griffiths, The Reign of King Henry VI (1981)

King Henry believed that an organised settlement, under his leadership, could be made between the opposing factions. Several great councils were called in late 1457, involving long and protracted negotiations between the parties. Henry eventually summoned a great council to Westminster, (Note: Westminster was two miles upstream from the city of London, and had a separate administration. Not only was the Palace of Westminster the king's personal residence, but it was also the seat of government, holding the Courts of Chancery, Exchequer and Law.) with the intent of eventually imposing his own arbitration award. The summons told how the king wished "to set apart such variances as be betwixt divers lords". This council was scheduled to meet in November 1457, but it received little interest from the nobility, only a few turning up. Among those who did were York and Salisbury, although the latter had been escorted—willingly or not is unknown—from Doncaster by Viscount Beaumont. The little that is known of this council stems from subsequent writs which simultaneously cancelled and reformed it. (Note: York's biographer, Paul Johnson, argues that, since this body was able to transact a small amount of significant business during its short lifespan, Henry "had done well to bring this first council to pass at all".) The council was rescheduled for 27 January 1458 and, this time, it appears to have been more positively received. Lords began arriving in London a few days before it was due to start. Each arrived with their retinues, which in the cases of the main protagonists involved substantial bodies of men. (Note: The medievalist John Gillingham has identified a trend in this, noting that each time the lords were summoned to a public occasion they were turning up with larger and larger retinues, which he calls "a sure sign of the steady growth of mutual mistrust".)

Henry tried to guarantee the safety of those attending, as he summoned levies from the counties for the defence of London and Westminster, which he then paraded through the City in a show of strength. On 26 January, York arrived with 400 armed followers; the Earl of Salisbury—still in London from the November council—had 500 men. Their attendance, if not their retinues, boded well for the king's plans. The Yorkists' bitter rivals soon followed. These included Henry, Duke of Exeter—who had aided the Percies in the feud with the Nevilles—and the new Duke of Somerset. Somerset had been involved in at least one attempt to assassinate Warwick the previous year. Described as "ducal hotheads" by historian R. L. Storey, they arrived soon after York with another 800 men between them. A fortnight later, the new Earl of Northumberland, Henry Percy, and his brothers Thomas, Lord Egremont and Sir Ralph Percy arrived, accompanied by John, Lord Clifford. Together, they brought a small army of around 1,500 men. The Earl of Warwick arrived last, coming from Calais—where he was Captain—having been delayed crossing the Channel. He brought another 600 men, seasoned soldiers of the town's garrison, all dressed in red jackets with his cognizance, the white ragged staff. (Note: York stayed at Baynard's Castle, Salisbury, at his London house The Erber and Warwick stayed with the Greyfriars.)

It was only after Warwick arrived that the king summoned members of the nobility less involved in the dispute, such as the Earl of Arundel. The sheer number of retainers involved meant an enormous increase in the City of London's daily population for it to manage. With tensions running high, civic leaders went to great lengths to keep the parties apart. The Lancastrians were lodged outside the city walls, at the Temple Bar and in Fleet Street. According to Griffiths, they were seen as "spoiling for a fight", and were therefore unwelcome in the city. The mayor and common council feared a pitched battle breaking out if the two sides and their entourages met. (Note: To keep the peace, the Mayor and aldermen armed 5,000 men to patrol the streets. The king subsequently acknowledged and thanked the City for their efforts in keeping the peace.) There was little appetite for reconciliation among the sons of the nobility killed at St Albans, and York and Salisbury were nearly ambushed by Exeter, Egremont and Clifford on their way to Westminster, although the attempt failed.

=== King's award ===
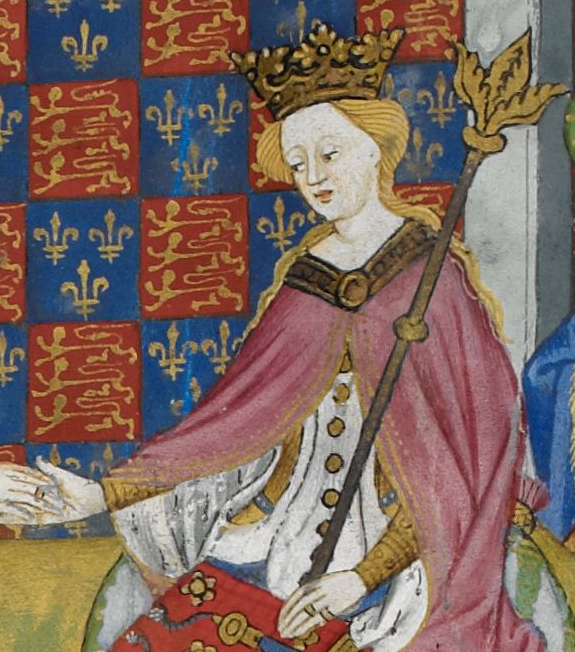
Henry's queen, Margaret of Anjou, who by the end of the 1450s had become a political force in her own right and an implacable enemy of the Duke of York

The great council met on 27 January 1458 (Note: Once again, says the historian J. R. Lander, "many of the lesser lords stayed away", as they had done the previous November.) and King Henry made a personal appearance before the newly gathered lords to make a plea for unity. He then withdrew to Chertsey, while the Mayor restored law and order following the attempted ambush of the Yorkists.

Henry returned to London in mid-February, but within the week he had retired to Berkhampstead Castle. York's biographer, Paul Johnson, suggests that, in doing so, Henry damaged any subsequent chance for the attendees to reach a "broad-based accommodation", as now they had no-one to adjudicate their arguments. Also, he suggests that, with the Yorkists effectively confined to the City, the Lancastrian lords could travel unhindered from their lodgings. And travel they did. While the king dwelt in Berkhampstead, Somerset, Exeter, Clifford and Egremont visited him on 23 February. It is not known whether their visit was regarding the imminent arbitration, but Johnson suggests that it was unwise of Henry to see them, in case it was perceived as breaching his perceived neutrality. Meanwhile, the council, says Wolffe, instead of commencing negotiations, "does not appear to have done anything until the middle of March", when the king returned to Westminster.

From that point on discussions,—led by Henry and certain impartial councillors—began in earnest. These negotiations, says Griffiths, "were long and doubtless acrimonious". The king prayed and prayed again for a settlement. Eventually—perhaps inevitably—one was reached, although the presence of so many armed men probably facilitated the process. Deliberations were carried out through intermediaries. Henry's councillors met the Yorkists in the City, at the Blackfriars, in the mornings; in the afternoons, they met the Lancastrian lords at the Whitefriars on Fleet Street. During the council's sittings, other policy issues were addressed. The question of the governorship of Ireland probably arose, and the Earl of Warwick was appointed admiral of the seas. This office had previously been held by the Duke of Exeter, further damaging relations between the two men. These were peripheral issues; the Battle of St Albans was the topic of overriding importance.

On 24 March, the king announced his decision. Blame for St Albans was placed squarely upon the Yorkist lords. The king did not spare them, telling of "the execrabill and moost detestable deed by theym doon at Seynt Albones". He emphasised the obviationem et insultationem ("opposition and insults"), as the chronicler, John Whethamstede, called them, that Somerset, Northumberland and Clifford had endured. For the king, his award served two purposes. He both acknowledged and condemned the wrongdoing and criminality done but, by doing so, demonstrated the king's grace in the role of keeper of the king's peace.

Similar to the arbitration awards the nobility imposed upon themselves and their tenants, the financial element was critical. York was to pay 5,000 marks (Note: A medieval English mark was a unit of currency equivalent to two-thirds of a pound.) to Somerset and his dowager mother, Warwick was to pay 1,000 to Lord Clifford, and Salisbury agreed to cancel the fines that had been imposed on Egremont and Ralph Percy in 1454. Salisbury was also, on behalf of his younger sons John and Thomas, (Note: Warwick was rarely involved in the feud with the Percies, being otherwise involved in his own disputed inheritance. On the other hand, says Griffiths, Warwick's younger brothers, Thomas and John, personally "spearheaded the Neville retaliation against the Percies".) to pay 12,000 marks to Eleanor Neville, Dowager Countess of Northumberland. (Note: Eleanor Neville was also Salisbury's elder sister.) She and her son, the new Earl, in turn pledged themselves to keep the peace with the Nevilles. The financial obligations that had been imposed on many Percy tenants after the feud with the Nevilles were also lifted. Further—because Egremont had escaped from Newgate in 1456—Salisbury also swore not to take any action against the Newgate sheriffs whose negligence was presumed to have enabled it. (Note: This was not an unusual policy, notes the historian Ralph B. Pugh. Throughout the 15th century, it was becoming increasingly common to levy "fines of fantastic proportions" on those who failed to hold prisoners, ranging from £400 to £4,000 depending on the person's rank. Pugh notes that Egremont's gaoler had been threatened with a fine of £2,000.)

Wolffe has argued that Henry's decision was no more than "a formal accord on the limited issue of atonement and compensation". Changing people's attitudes towards their enemies was considered more important than the question of compensation, important though that was. Furthermore, York and Warwick's payments to the families of their enemies were not in cash; rather, they were to renounce debts owed them by the crown which amounted to similar sums. To fulfil their obligations, York and the Nevilles merely had to return government-issued tallies which entitled them to receive the required sum. The Yorkists, for their part, were declared to be the king's "true lieges", although any reassurance they took from this, comments the medievalist John Watts, may have been tempered by the knowledge that so also had been the three dead lords of St Albans.

The Yorkists agreed to endow St Albans Abbey with a new chantry and £45 a year for two years for the monks to say masses for the slain. The Lancastrian lords, as the injured parties, had to make no reciprocal concessions to York and his allies. Egremont was required to make an independent bond of 4,000 marks towards the Nevilles to keep the peace with them in Yorkshire for ten years. Thus, says the scholar Helen Maurer, the crown implicitly recognised that bad blood had existed between the Nevilles and Egremont even before St Albans. One contemporary observed in a Paston letter that the final settlement was a "throw [sic: thorough] peace final[ised] by means of all the Lords".

== The Loveday ==
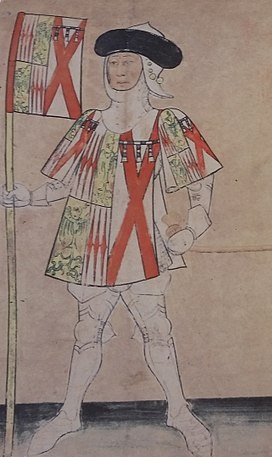
Richard Neville, Earl of Salisbury; York's closest political ally and head of the powerful northern Neville family

The pact was announced on 25 March, or Lady Day (the Feast of the Annunciation of the Virgin). Henry—"thanking God for their having reaching accord"—joined his wife and nobles on a celebratory procession from Westminster to London. Leading the parade were Somerset and Salisbury—36 years older than the duke—followed by Exeter with Warwick, then "the King alone, wearing his crown and royal robes" between them all. Finally came York and Queen Margaret. All parties held hands: a later chronicle described how "one of the one faction, and another of the other sect, and behind the King, the Duke of Yorke led the Queene with great familiaritie to all mens sighte". Although no contemporary records now survive to provide the physical details of the Loveday procession itself, scholars are aware of the general nature of medieval urban processions. The scholar Kathleen Ashley has highlighted how they presented what she has called a "fusion of sensory experiences, or synaesthesia" for both the participants and observers, who would often amount to as many people as could physically attend, on account of the holiday atmosphere that accompanied them.

Historians have noted multiple interpretations of the symbolism favoured by Henry. It was "a symbolic series of gestures", says John Sadler, perhaps a show of "friendly and modest intimacies" suggests Patricia Ingham. Or it may have been mere rhetoric, bordering on a charade, suggests Pollard. At the time, physical intimacy was an essential element of concord and the intention was clearly to demonstrate both their agreement and their willingness to agree. The queen holding York's hand (rather than him holding Somerset's), says Watts, was an acknowledgement of her close involvement in the affairs of central government and her higher political profile in the post-St Albans body politic. The Loveday was a combination, says Griffiths, of "elaborate ceremonial, royal prayer and example, monetary payments and the holding of hands...[between] bitter enemies". The assembled lords were taking no more chances now than they had when they first arrived in London: Salisbury, for example, attended the concomitant religious ceremony at St Paul's with his retinue of 400 men, which included 80 knights and esquires, waiting in the churchyard. It may have been called a Loveday, comments Sadler, yet "the title is ironic, as there was little of love in the air". The closing event was the presentation of a new translation of the contemporary verse paraphrase, Knyghthode and Bataile to the king. This was a recent adaptation of De re militari and celebrates the martial exploits of the noble class in a classic chivalric form.

The immediate aftermath of the Loveday was positive, not least for the Nevilles, as the king granted Egremont permission to go on a pilgrimage in June 1458. From the government's perspective, this was an opportunity to physically remove one of the parties to a dispute. Pollard casts some doubt on whether Egremont actually wanted to go on pilgrimage, arguing that "no doubt he had been persuaded" to do so, as previous attempts to quieten him in the north—through French service in 1453 and imprisonment in 1456—had failed. The king and his council seem to have also concluded by now that the Percies and the Nevilles' feud in the north was the primary cause of St Albans, and their treatment of Egremont reflected that. If this was the case, notes Watts, such a policy made the mistake of ignoring the enmity between other parties, for instance, York and Somerset.

The king went on his own pilgrimage to St Albans at Easter the same year. This, says Griffiths, "demonstrated that the site of the battle in which he had been wounded and his ministers slain no longer stirred fearful memories in his mind". The appearance of amity was maintained publicly "with a royal round of jousts, feasting, and other entertainments until May" that year. These festivities took place both at the Tower of London and at the queen's Palace at Greenwich, further emphasising her involvement in the proceedings.

== Aftermath ==
The Earl of Salisbury subsequently had an exemplification copy of the Loveday agreement made. This, to Hicks, suggests that he saw the award as to his benefit, notwithstanding the recompenses he was ordered to make. All Salisbury had to do was—in Storey's words—"give up bad debts". Another probable consequence of the Loveday deliberations may have been that in May, Salisbury's son Sir John Neville was betrothed to a ward of the queen. This was Isabella Ingaldsthorpe, (Note: Isabel Ingoldsthorpe is occasionally also referred to as Elizabeth in Exchequer records.) the heiress of her maternal uncle, John Tiptoft and his earldom of Worcester, and the betrothal would not have been possible without Margaret's permission. The crown itself benefited from the Loveday as its role as arbiter-in-chief—"the cement of the political fabric", wrote Anthony Gross—was reaffirmed in a blaze of publicity. Johnson argues that the traditional and probably definitive way of uniting the nobility was war, and this was too firmly disapproved of by the king ever to be an option.

=== Legacy ===
There is some disagreement among historians as to who won or lost at the Loveday. Hicks considers it to have been a "reasonable compromise", with which the Yorkists appear to "have been pleased with the result". Conversely, Griffiths saw it as being punitive to them. Watts suggests that it indicates that, notwithstanding St Albans, "York and the Nevilles were regarded as acceptable by the ruling lords". Johnson argues that York, at the least, did "very well" out of it. To the scholar David Grummitt, this Loveday illustrated the "essentially private and personal nature of the dispute" between the Yorkists and their enemies. More broadly, though, the personal basis for their enmity was, in the long term, disadvantageous to the Yorkists. By focussing on, and emphasising, the personal quarrels between York and Somerset—or Salisbury and Northumberland for example—the award ignored and sidelined the original complaints of the Yorkists that they had argued led to the battle. (Note: As recent scholarship expresses it, the Loveday "assisted in the propagation of this negative view of Yorkist activity. By presenting St Albans as a simple quarrel amongst magnates, rather than a clash between the king's good and bad counsellors (as the Yorkist version of events suggested), the terms of the royal award effectively deprived the Yorkists of their justification for having risen in arms". The agreement sought, says the medievalist G. L. Harriss, to "bury the past rather than rewrite it", and made no provision for a future settlement either.) Furthermore, he says, if any part of the nobility were united by the Loveday, it was the Yorkist lords. Historian Christine Carpenter has suggested that the king wanted to keep the occasion one of "general reconciliation and restoration of magnate unity". She argues that not highlighting the degree to which the nobility was divided was a deliberate policy, but the involvement of the queen meant there had to be "a formal recognition...that there were two opposing camps".

The Loveday saw the Yorkists—for the first time—acknowledge their wrongdoing and accept culpability for St Albans. This was something they had denied immediately after the battle and in the years following, but was insufficient in the long term, says Pollard, because it did not contain the one thing that the new Lancastrian lords most wanted—revenge for their fathers. It was not, therefore, "a satisfying long-term solution" that guaranteed future peace as intended.

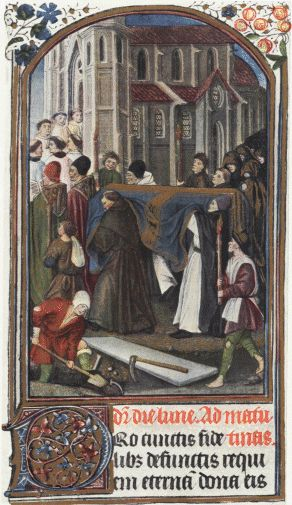
A contemporary illustration of a procession entering the medieval St Paul's Cathedral—in the background—where the nobility gathered on 25 March 1458

=== Contemporary reaction ===
Historian Cora Scofield suggests that the Loveday procession to St Paul's was "doubtless an edifying spectacle, but it had little real meaning and probably deceived no-one". Not long after the Loveday, an anonymous poem was published entitled Take Good Heed; this offers the Yorkist lords advice and anxious support for the years ahead which, the author recognises, will be difficult ones for all. Other writers were more optimistic. The poem Reconciliation of Henry VI and the Yorkists repeats the refrain, "rejoise, Angleonde to concorde and unité", suggesting that the author expects the kingdom to be strong and unified going forward. The author of the Reconciliation emphasises how "ther was bytwyn hem lovely contynaunce / Whiche was gret ioy to all that ther were". The author expands on his theme:

In Yorke, In Somerset, as I understonde,
In Warrewik also is loue & charite,
In Sarisbury eke, & in Northumbreland,
That euery man may reioise in concord & unite.

Not all commentators were impressed: a Coventry preacher, one William Ive, said caustically that the king "made Lovedays as Judas made with a kiss with Christ". Enemies may have marched together that day, argues Scofield, but they trusted each other no more after the procession than they had before. This was the view of Thomas Malory in his mid-century Morte darthur, which expresses a cynicism regarding Lovedays as a means of settling feuds. Malory's pessimism was probably caused by his view of the 1458 ceremony. Malory portrays Lancelot as attempting to atone for the murders of his enemies through the building of chapels—"penitence as a remedy for war", suggests literary scholar Robert L. Kelly. But Lancelot's, like Henry's, attempts are in vain: "Lo what meschef lyth in variaunce / Amonge lordis, whan þei nat accorde", comments Malory on both.

== Failure to prevent crisis ==
The peace ordained at the Loveday, says Pollard, "was shallow and shortlived"; having killed Somerset, York no longer had a blatant enemy in government and so could only make concessions. The opposition, on the other hand, had wanted revenge. Hence the Loveday failed to solve the underlying crisis in the long term, "the atmosphere of distrust and intrigue still continued". Indeed, the Loveday itself may have contributed to a heightening of tensions within the nobility. It reopened the very question as to what actually happened at St Albans; but, having opened it, not only failed to provide an answer but highlighted existing divisions. The government, for its part, contributed to the decline in relations with the Yorkists. This was because by releasing the Percies from their constraints, old rivalries were reawakened. The Loveday's undermining of the Nevilles in Yorkshire now shifted the regional balance of power.

In November 1458, there was an ugly brawl at Westminster between the Earl of Warwick's men and those of the Duke of Somerset, which the earl saw as another attempted assassination. He had to fight his way clear of the Palace, and escaped to Calais. At the same time, York and the Nevilles were increasingly isolated by the queen's party politically. Law and order also declined, and in December 1458, 1,000 pikes and clubs were ordered for the Royal Household's protection of the king.

Henry's organisation of the 1458 Loveday negotiations was one of the last occasions of his reign in which he showed either an interest in or a commitment towards affairs of state. From that point on, Queen Margaret began subtly, but clearly, asserting the control of herself and her adherents in government. The Duke of York retired to his marcher estates, and the Earl of Salisbury to his in the north. Carpenter has posited that—"ironically at the most overt moment of conciliation"—the Loveday represents the point at which magnate disunity could no longer be denied, and therefore, when the Wars of the Roses actually begun. The few months following the Loveday are obscure. The following year, armed conflict broke out again when Salisbury's army was ambushed at Blore Heath by a Lancastrian army. He and the other Yorkists lords were indicted for treason in the Coventry Parliament, at the queen's instigation. At this time, the Yorkists were still, supposedly, paying their dues to their opponents from 1455. Within three years of King Henry's Loveday he had been deposed, the Duke of York killed in battle and his son Edward crowned the first Yorkist King of England.
