= Charles Ross (historian) =

20th-century British historian of the Middle Ages

- Born: Wakefield, 1924
- Died: April 3, 1986 (aged 61–62); Clifton, Bristol
- Known for: Promulgating and developing McFarlane's new paradigm on patronage as the social nexus of 15th-century England

Academic background
- Education: University of Oxford
- Doctoral advisor: K. B. McFarlane, Brasenose College, Oxford

Academic work
- Discipline: Medieval English History, the medieval nobility, the Wars of the Roses, the Yorkist kings, Bastard feudalism
- Institutions: University of Bristol
- Doctoral students: Michael Hicks; Ralph A. Griffiths; A. J. Pollard

Charles Derek Ross (1924–1986) was an English historian of the Late Middle Ages. Originally from Yorkshire, he earned a DPhil from Oxford University and worked as a lecturer, researcher and ultimately professor at the University of Bristol from 1947 until his death in 1986. Specialising in the medieval English nobility, gentry and royal family, he is considered the major propagator of K. B. McFarlane's ideas on bastard feudalism, and published widely on a plethora of subjects ranging from the biographies of kings to the cartularies of minor abbeys.

== Early life ==
Ross was born in Wakefield to Florence Ross and her husband and was educated at the grammar school. He began reading History at Brasenose College, Oxford in 1942. (Note: Due to British Army requirements, the college had been sequestered for the duration, so Ross's undergraduate degree was studied for at Christ Church, Oxford.) This was followed by doctoral studies under K. B. McFarlane—"whose work was then transforming historical understanding of later medieval England" (Note: The medieval historian Christine Carpenter has written that "it is hard to exaggerate the impact of McFarlane's work, especially at Oxford where he taught. A whole generation of students there was inspired to work on what had been a very neglected century; nearly all the political historians of fourteenth and fifteenth century England today, including the present writer, are, academically speaking, the children or grandchildren, even great grandchildren, of McFarlane.")—and Ross's resultant DPhil was entitled The Yorkshire Baronage, 1399–1425.

== Career ==
Following his doctorate, Ross began working at the University of Bristol, where he would remain for the rest of his academic life, in 1947. Originally appointed Assistant Lecturer, he worked beneath David Douglas. Ross's final position at Bristol was as Professor of Medieval History, with a personal chair.

Originally teaching alongside Margaret Sharp (daughter of T. F. Tout), he became reader and then Professor of Medieval History.

She taught jointly with a much younger man, Charles Ross, who was a 15th-century historian, and I opted to do the special subject which they taught together—I suppose looking back on it, as far as we were concerned quite easily, but from their point of view it was probably rather difficult, because he was very young and she was in the latter stages of her career. But they did it extremely well.

— Ralph A. Griffiths recalling Ross and Sharp's joint Special Subject at Bristol.

Ross took early retirement in 1982 but maintained close ties with the University and continued his research. Indeed, he had contracted to write another book shortly before his death, and was attempting to give up drinking to that end.

=== Publishing ===
Ross published predominantly on the history of the later medieval English nobility, royalty and the Wars of the Roses. His biographies of Edward IV from 1974, and Richard III seven years later were described by The Times as respectively "scholarly and detailed" and perceptive". They fused easy reading, suitable for a general readership, with the minute approach to detail and sourcing required in a high-end piece of scholarship. The historian DeLloyd J. Guth concluded that the biography was "in the best tradition" of McFarlane, and left the previous work—Cora Scofield's 1926 biography—"flounder[ing] in a wealth of facts and episodes". Although Colin Richmond believed that it remained less an achievement than Scofield's—if only because it had greater and more plentiful scholarship to work upon—he praised Ross's analysis of political tension. (Note: Reception was not universally approving among these of Ross's colleagues, however. Guth argued that Ross made too much of a paucity of evidence in drawing the generally negative conclusions he did regarding Edward's handling of law and order, while Colin Richmond believed he outright overstated it. B. P. Wolffe also suggested that Ross placed too much blame on the King for the events of Summer 1483, events that were, in most cases, beyond his control.) King Edward IV was one of Ross's main royal interests. The other was Richard III. Before Ross's biography, Edward was seen as a generally successful, relatively modern king, and a worthy precursor to Henry VII, after Ross questioned "Edward’s newly enhanced reputation, the king’s prestige has once more been considerably set back". Ross appreciated the king in a particularly new way. Ross also edited several volumes of essays. For example, in 1970, Ross, Stanley Chrimes and Ralph Griffiths edited the papers presented at the 1970 medieval history colloquium in Cardiff. His friendship with the Gloucestershire publisher Alan Sutton allowed him to publish several books, including a compilation of his students' and colleagues' 1978 Bristol papers, again under his editorship.

== Personal life and marriages ==
Ross was married twice. His first marriage, to Frances, lasted 23 years; she subsequently moved to Swansea. They had two children, Christopher—born shortly after the Second World War—and a daughter, Miranda. His second wife was Anne Crawford, who had been a student of his at Bristol, and with whom he had a son, James. (Note: James Ross would later deliver a paper on the 1404 conspiracy of Maud, Countess of Oxford to the reformed 'Bristol connection' symposium, organised by Peter Fleming and Keith Dockray at the University of the West of England in 2001. In 2011, Crawford dedicated her biography of John Howard, Duke of Norfolk to Ross's memory.) Crawford agreed to a divorce from Ross in 1985, following Ross’s long-term affair with Pamela Jefferis, whom he had met when she was taking evening classes at the university. Jefferis had separated from her husband over a decade earlier. His divorce from Crawford was made absolute shortly before his death, but about a year before then he shared his apartment with Pamela Jefferis.

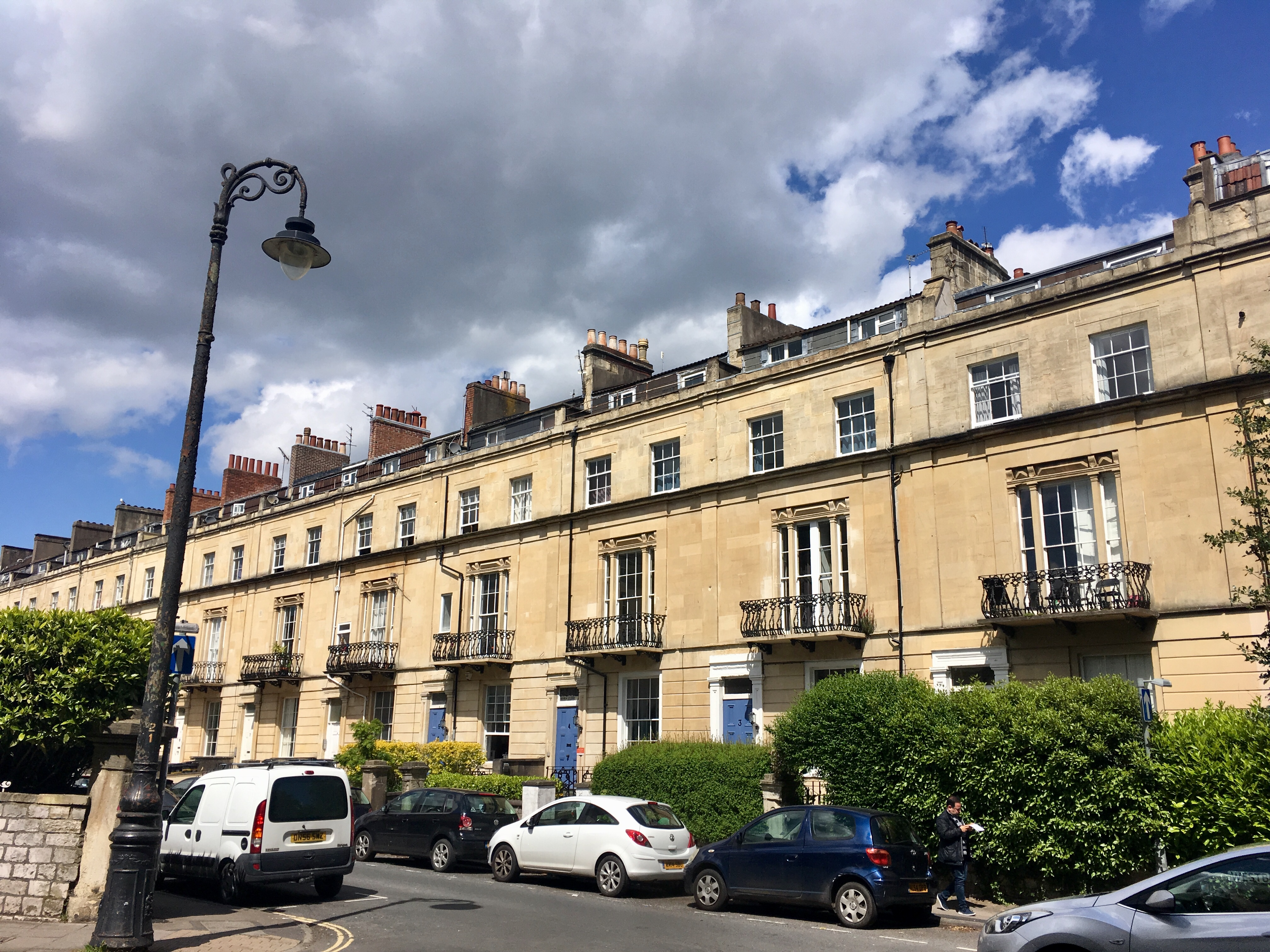
Westbourne Place, Clifton, Bristol, as seen in May 2019, Professor Ross's last residence

She was later described as a "responsible and intelligent" woman.

By the time Ross was due to retire, he was estranged from his second wife, who remained at their large family home in the Redland area bringing up their son alone. Ross lived in a "large, semi-detached Georgian" apartment in Clifton, in the heart of the university's housing, which he and Jefferis had bought between them in 1984. They apparently planned to marry towards the end of March but continued obstructions in their respective divorces had forced its cancellation twice. (Note: At the time, it was reported that the numerous delays to their marriage came from both Ross's divorce and that of Jefferis.) The defence suggested that it was these delays that had unbalanced Jefferis. Adding to her stress, Ross had become sicker since November 1985, which had made him harder to live with ("more petulant", it was later reported) and in April she discovered that one of her own children needed a brain scan.

=== Death ===
Ross and Jefferis spent the days before his death "drinking heavily", reported the Western Daily Press. (Note: Ross was later found to have suffered convulsions due to withdrawal symptoms and, also as a result of her alcoholism, Jefferis had an enlarged liver.) Jefferis and Ross had stayed in the flat apart from a "brief" sojourn to a local hostelry. That evening, Thursday, 3 April 1986, at the age of 64, Ross was found dead there. The cause of death was a single stab wound in the back, which was later revealed to have pierced an artery. The day before his death furniture and clothes were thrown down the stairs, and neighbours helped Jefferis carry them back up. The following night, she was overheard crying and neighbours called the police, who broke into Ross's flat and found Jefferis next to him, "staring 'vacantly' at her hands". She did not answer questions. A 25-strong police squad carried out house to house inquiries overnight.

Jefferis, from Bishopstone, a mother of three and 42 at the time of the killing, (Note: Or possibly 44.) was questioned by police on Friday night at Southmead police station, and that same morning an autopsy was performed by the Home Office pathologist. The following Monday she was remanded in custody at the Magistrates' Court for Ross's murder. On Saturday 11 July she was charged and sent to trial.

At her trial at Bristol Crown Court, Jefferis pled guilty to manslaughter on account of diminished responsibility, which plea was accepted by the prosecutor. Defence counsel argued that it was unlikely the true facts surrounding that night would ever be known, suggesting that Jefferis suffered from such emotional collapse that she had erased all memory of events, a condition recognised by psychiatrists, he claimed. The Prosecution agreed that "mystery still surrounded" those last moments because of the parties' dependency on alcohol. The court heard that she and Ross had been in a relationship—described as often "stormy", as well as "turbulent [and] violent"―since around 1972. Ross's colleagues described how on one occasion he presented to the Homeopathic Hospital with glass in his eye, after his spectacles were smashed during a fight with her; another time, "he went to work limping, saying Mrs Jefferis had driven the car at him". Furthermore, both were apparently alcoholics. Mr Justice Stuart-Smith, presiding, commented that "it is quite clear that alcoholism was at the root of this, it degraded you both ... I do not suppose anyone will ever know what led you to putting that knife in him". Jefferis was said to have "cracked" under the strain the relationship put upon her; her defence said that—with the exception of her children—she had "destroyed what mattered to her ... most of all". She was sent to prison for four years. A memorial service for Professor Ross was held at the Lord Mayor's Chapel on College Green on 4 July.

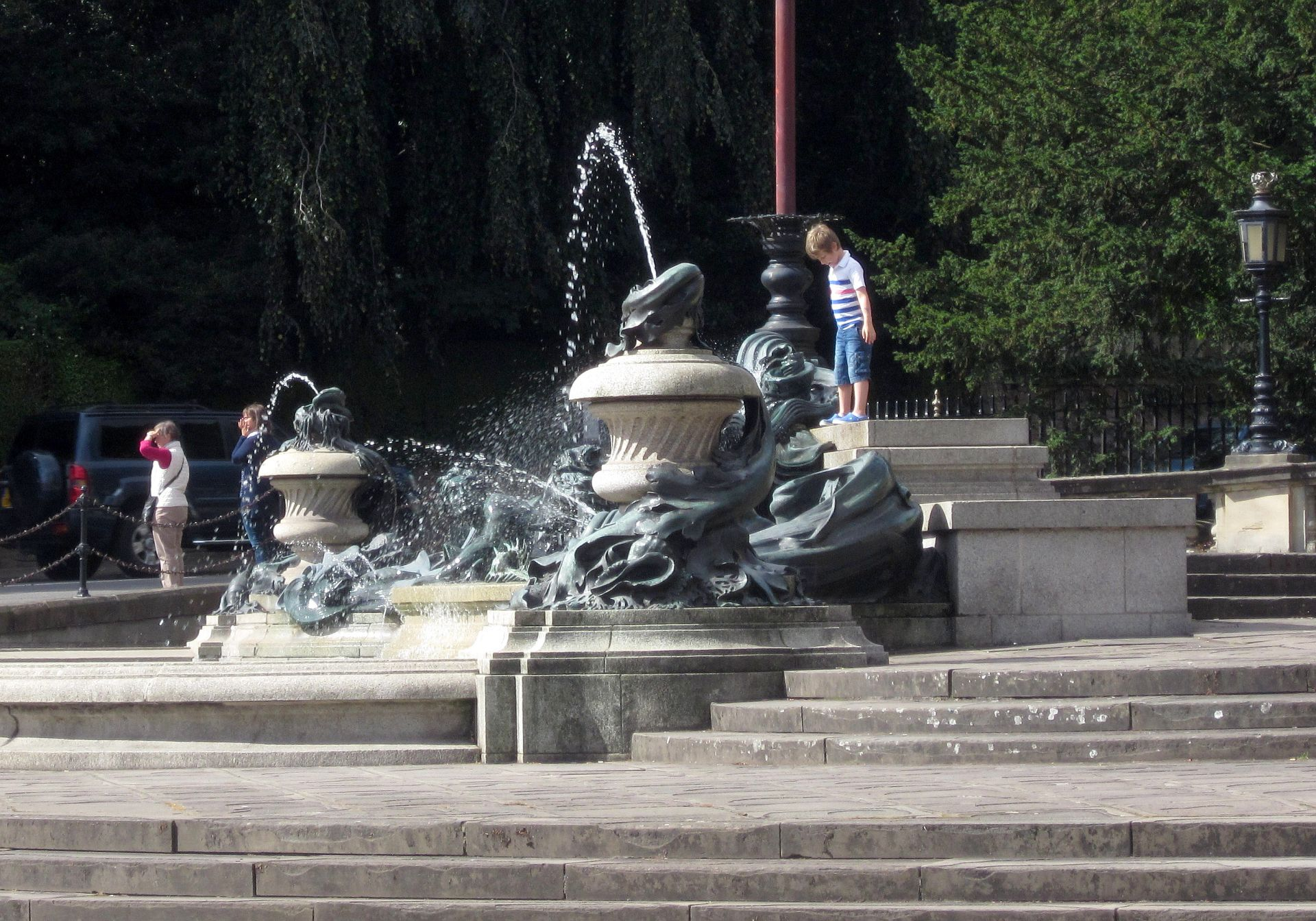
2013 view of the King Edward VII fountain, outside Clifton's Victoria Rooms, into which Jefferis threw Ross the week before he died

== Influence and reputation ==
He had a very complicated social life. He was a very witty, charming man and obviously some ladies found him attractive.

He was a brilliant scholar and will be sorely missed.

— Bristol University spokesperson Don Carleton reflecting on Professor Ross's multifaceted approach to life in 1986

Ross was an archival historian. The Times described his editorial method as being based on a "meticulous concern for detail". The Times wrote after his death of his "amusing and stimulating" lecturing style and how his teaching inspired many of his students to follow his path. The university's spokesman commented on Ross's various extracurricular activities but emphasised his scholarly achievements. He had an international reputation in his field.

=== 'The Bristol connection' ===
In 1978, Ross organised a symposium at Bristol with the intention of providing "an informal and friendly gathering" to allow younger scholars the opportunity to present their own papers. This symposium saw the unofficial foundation of the Bristol connection, a group of former students of Ross's and several contemporary historians. Among the former including Margaret Condon, Keith Dockray, Ralph Griffiths, Michael Hicks—"proud also to be a member of 'the Bristol connection'"—and Tony Pollard.

Ross's pupils included Michael Hicks, Anne Crawford and Ralph Griffiths. To his students he passed on the approach of McFarlane, particularly that of drawing broad social or political themes from gentry and aristocratic networks. Hicks has called Ross the "founding father" of the 'Bristol connection'. (Note: Hicks has summarised the connection's historical philosophy, per McMcFarlane, who left a school of historians committed, like him, to a view of Bastard feudalism based on a retinue comprised principally of gentry who were non-resident and retained by indenture and/or fee: what are often called extraordinary retainers. The starting point was usually the noble family—the Percies, Beauchamps, Staffords, Mowbrays, Hollands, Courtenays, Talbots, Hungerfords, or Greys of Ruthin.)

Ross's students and colleagues intended a book of essays to be published in 1986 as a Festschrift celebrating Ross's retirement. Edited by Professor Ralph Griffiths and Mr James Sherborne, it was published after Ross's death as a memorium.

Ross's obituarist concluded that, personally, "he had a great sense of humour as well as a sharp wit, and he had a fund of good stories". His colleague, Professor Joel T. Rosenthal of SUNY, commented that "Ross's friends are also McFarlane's heirs, and that we are all Marc Bloch's grandchildren".

== Bibliography ==
- 'Materials for the Study of Baronial Incomes in Fifteenth-Century England,' Economic History Review, NS, vol.6 no. 2 (1953) (with T.B. Pugh)
- 'The Estates and Finances of Richard Beauchamp, Earl of Warwick,' Dugdale Society Occasional papers No. 12 (1956)
- C. D. Ross (ed.), Cartulary of St. Mark's Hospital Bristol (Bristol Record Society Publications, Vol. XXI, Bristol, 1959)
- Fifteenth Century England, 1399-1509: Studies in Politics and Society, Manchester 1972 (with Stanley Chrimes and Ralph Griffiths)
- Edward IV (1974) ISBN 0-413-28680-0
- The Wars of the Roses: A Concise History (1976) ISBN 0-500-25049-9
- Richard III (1981) ISBN 0-413-29530-3

=== Festschriften ===
- Griffiths, R. A.; Sherborne, J. W., eds. (1986). Kings and Nobles in the Later Middle Ages: A Tribute to Charles Ross. Gloucester: St. Martin's Press. ISBN 978-0-31200-080-6.
