= William of Chiriton =

Prior of Lanthony Secunda from 1377 to 1401

- Prior of Lanthony Secunda
- Church: Lanthony Secunda Priory
- Installed: 1377
- Term ended: 1401
- Predecessor: Simon of Brockworth
- Successor: John Lymnor

William of Chiriton (also Cheriton, Chirton) was prior of Lanthony Secunda from 1377 to 1401.

== Early life ==
He is believed to come from Chirton, a manor held by Lanthony Secunda.

In 1349, following the Black Death, William was one of eight canons of Lanthony Secunda issued with dimissorial letters authorising his promotion by any Catholic bishop. He was ordained a subdeacon in September 1349, a deacon in February 1350, and a priest in March 1350.

From July 1360 to October 1364 he was resident in Ireland as proctor, having been nominated as the priory's attorney in 1360, 1362, and 1363.

== Prior of Lanthony Secunda ==
Lanthony Secunda priory

Simon of Brockworth died in February 1377. The priory petitioned the king on or before 15 February to accept the election of William of Chiriton as prior, and on 5 March notice of royal assent was given to the Bishop of Worcester.

He is described as an "energetic" prior and despite inheriting debts of £128 8s 4d (equivalent to £217,000 in 2025) embarked on an extensive construction program. He is credited with restoring Lanthony Secunda's financial security, and following his priorship the priory prospered.

During his priorship he repaired the chapel of the Trinity, and Secunda's walls, cloisters, and granary. At Barrington, he spent 300 marks (£200) repairing the manor and chapel. He also built a new bridge and made other repairs at Little Barrington and Windrush. At Secunda's other manors and churches he repaired or rebuilt the chancels and granges.

In 1386, he was ordered imprisoned by the king until he paid arrears of clerical taxation granted to the king in 1383 and 1384. In 1397 Thomas, lord Despenser, asked William to provide five men-at-arms and fifteen archers to attend the Parliament of September.

=== Ireland ===
In 1381, he requested the priory's proctor in Ireland, Richard Chirton, to provide a listing of all Lanthony Secunda's holdings in Ireland and their values. This was probably a response to declining revenues from Secunda's Irish holdings.

In the same year William wrote to the priory's patron, Thomas of Buckingham, requesting that he intercede with Richard II to grant Lanthony permission to export its Irish profits. This was granted later in 1381. Two years later, at the request of Buckingham, Richard placed Secunda's Irish holdings under his protection.

William travelled twice there to recover the church of St Mary of Drogheda. In 1394 he travelled there on the king's service. In his absence he appointed as his attorneys Robert Charlton and John Lymnor.

=== Dispute with Gloucester ===
Relations between Lanthony Secunda and the town of Gloucester had historically been amiable, but between 1390 and 1392 the two engaged in a dispute. Part of this dispute involved a suit brought against Secunda. It alleged that William and three canons had broken into the house of John Compton and Richard Ashwell and stolen some of their possessions.

It culminated in a loveday held on 10 January 1392, where both parties listed their grievances. William complained of his privileges being denied by the burgesses, that students and servants of the priory were harassed, that his properties had been encroached on, and that he and his priory had been treated maliciously several times by the town.

The town complained that its properties had been encroached on, that a door in St Kyneburg's chapel enabled free entrance and exit from the town, and of the priory's new court at St Owens.

=== Death ===
William of Chiriton is last recorded on 19 July 1401. He was succeeded by his subprior, John Lymnor, later that year. His register survives as TNA C 115/78, no. 6684.

Catholic Church titles
Preceded by Simon of Brockworth	Prior of Lanthony Secunda; 1377–1401	Succeeded by John Lymnor
