= Michael Hicks (historian) =

British historian (born 1948)

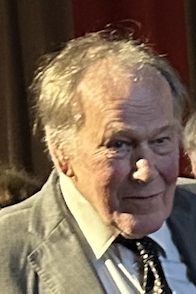
- Hicks in 2025
- Born: 3 December 1948 (age 77); England
- Known for: Anti-Ricardianism

Academic background
- Education: University of Bristol; University of Southampton; University of Oxford
- Doctoral advisor: C. A. J. Armstrong, Hertford College, Oxford

Academic work
- Discipline: Medieval English History, the Yorkist Kings, the Wars of the Roses, Richard III, bastard feudalism
- Institutions: King Alfred's College, Winchester; University of Winchester

Michael A. Hicks (born 1948) is an English historian, specialising in the history of late medieval England, in particular the Wars of the Roses, the nature of late medieval society, and the kings and nobility of the period.

== Education and academic career ==
Hicks studied under Charles Ross while a final-year undergraduate student at the University of Bristol (1969–70), T. B. Pugh for his M.A. at Southampton (1971), and C. A. J. Armstrong for his DPhil. at the University of Oxford (1975), which he had originally begun under J. R. L. Highfield. In his own words, his research was – and remained – firmly placed within "the school of history founded by the late K. B. McFarlane ... the Master" although with a heavy "biographical bent". His first published article, however, was on an aspect of law in the seventeenth century. Having worked for the Victoria County History project between 1974 and 1978, he joined King Alfred's College, Winchester, later the University of Winchester. A proposed joint paper with his former tutor, Charles Ross, on bastard feudalism had come to nothing by 1978, and a suggestion by Gerald Harriss for a joint study with Christine Carpenter, Michael Hicks and himself "foundered on [their] incompatible points of view".

=== Research and interests ===
Originally firmly wedded to the McFarlane understanding of bastard feudalism, in which the nobility were motivated almost solely by financial and material interests, in which "self-interest, self-advantage, and self-preservation featured largely", this perspective gradually evolved, by the last decade of the twentieth century, into a more "complex" understanding of the English nobility, in which their piety and religious belief, idealism and individuality are as important motives in "high politics" as material benefit. In a 2014 interview with Royal Studies Journal, he opined that, until recently, "all History was political"; but noted that there was an increasingly thematic trend to historical research.

== Retirement and later activity ==
Eventually Professor of Medieval History and head of department at the University of Winchester until his retirement, he was appointed Emeritus Professor in September 2014. He is a Fellow of the Royal Historical Society, and the reviews editor for the peer-reviewed Southern History journal. It has been calculated that in the thirty-five year period to 2013 he published seventy-five articles and full-length studies, averaging over two per year. As of 2012, his most recent work has centred on the Inquisitions post mortem, and he is now principal investigator on a project "dedicated to creating a digital edition of the medieval English inquisitions".

== Exhumation and reburial of Richard III ==
Interviewed by the BBC in September 2012, amid the "upsurge of interest" in Richard III, Hicks commented disparagingly about the efforts of the Richard III Society campaign to rehabilitate the dead king: "The Richard III Society consists of some who contain an extreme and romantic view. They publish scholarly work in the belief that it will eventually exculpate Richard III, but it hasn't actually done so."

Hicks also expressed doubt that the bones discovered in Leicester were actually those of the king, saying "lots of other people who suffered similar wounds could have been buried in the choir of the church where the bones were found", and raising doubts about some of the evidence brought forward. Elsewhere he called the television series The White Queen's portrayal of the people and time "useful and informative".

=== Recognition ===
A festschrift for Michael Hicks was published in 2015 by Boydell and Brewer, and included contributions from academic colleagues and past students. Of the former these included Caroline Barron, Anne Curry, Ralph A. Griffiths, Christopher Dyer, Tony Pollard, and James Ross. Of his former students, Gordon McKelvie, Jessica Lutkin, and Karen Stober all contributed, as did the editor of the journal The Ricardian, Anne F. Sutton.

== Select publications ==
- False, Fleeting, Perjur’d Clarence (1980), ISBN 0-90438-744-5
- Richard III and his Rivals : Magnates and their Motives in the War of the Roses (1991), ISBN 1-85285-053-1
- Who's who in late Medieval England (1991), ISBN 0-85683-092-5
- Bastard Feudalism (1995), ISBN 0-582-06091-5
- Warwick the Kingmaker (1998), ISBN 0-631-16259-3
- Richard III (2000), ISBN 0-7524-1781-9
- English Political Culture in the Fifteenth Century (2002), ISBN 0-415-21763-6
- Edward V (2003), ISBN 0-7524-1996-X
- The Wars of the Roses 1455-1485 (2003), ISBN 978-1-841-76491-7
- Edward IV (2004), ISBN 0-340-76005-2
- Anne Neville: Queen to Richard III (2006), ISBN 0-7524-3663-5
- The Family of Richard III (2015), ISBN 978-1445621258
- Richard III: The Self-Made King (2019), ISBN 978-0300214291
