= John Beaumont, 1st Viscount Beaumont =

English nobleman (1409–1460)

John Beaumont
- Viscount Beaumont
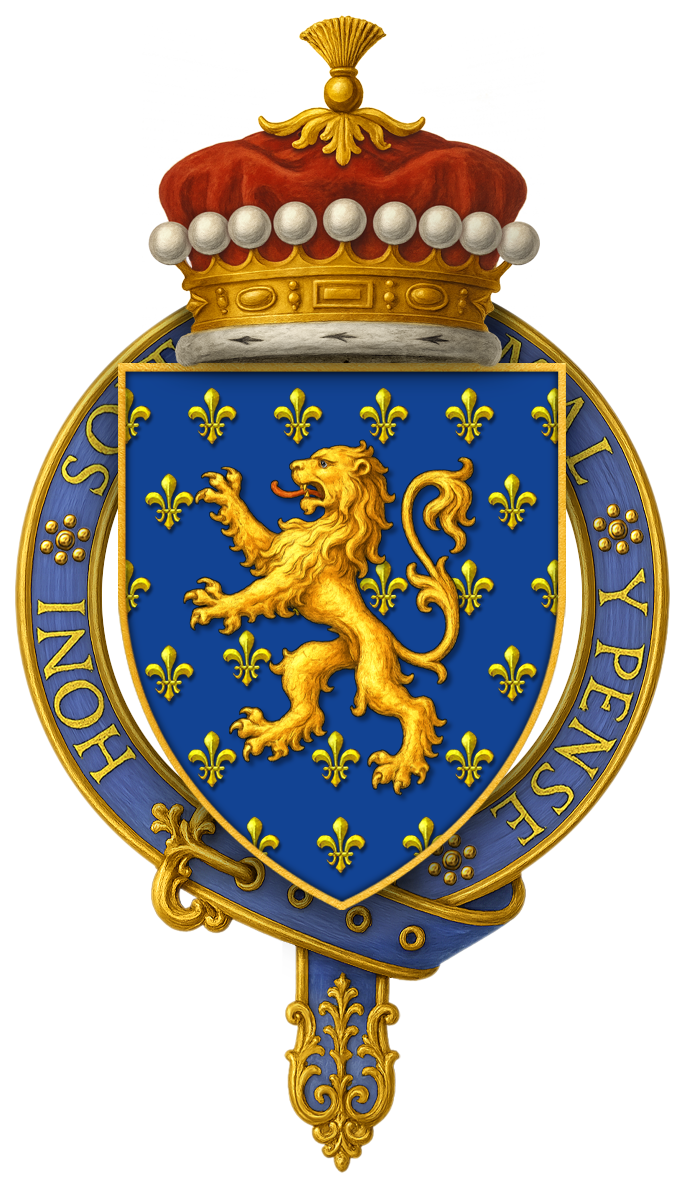
- Arms of Sir John Beaumont, 1st Viscount Beaumont, KG
- Other titles: 6th Baron Beaumont
- Born: c. 1409; Folkingham Castle, Lincolnshire
- Died: 10 July 1460; Northampton, Northamptonshire
- Offices: Steward of the Duchy of Lancaster; Lord Great Chamberlain; Lord High Constable
- Noble family: House of Beaumont
- Spouses: Elizabeth Phelip; Katherine Neville, Duchess of Norfolk
- Issue: William Beaumont, 2nd Viscount Beaumont
- Father: Henry, 5th Baron Beaumont
- Mother: Elizabeth Willoughby of Eresby

John Beaumont, 1st Viscount Beaumont (c. 1409 – 10 July 1460), was an English nobleman and magnate from Folkingham, Lincolnshire. He was a councillor to King Henry VI and was rewarded for his services, becoming a leading member of the East Anglian nobility. Beaumont held numerous offices for the crown, and was promoted up the peerage to become the first man with the rank of viscount. He also amassed immense personal wealth, acquired through inheritance, marriage, and royal patronage.

Beaumont was present for some of the most notable events of Henry VI's reign. He was present at the arrest of Humphrey, Duke of Gloucester in 1447, helped defend the king against Jack Cade's Rebellion in 1450, and helped suppress the rebellion of Richard, Duke of York in 1452. While York and his allies ended up fighting against the king, Beaumont remained loyal to the Lancastrian crown during the 1450s, which saw the beginning of the Wars of the Roses. His personal loyalty to Henry VI eventually cost him his life – he was killed, bodyguarding the king, at the Battle of Northampton in 1460. Beaumont's son, William Beaumont, continued the struggle against the Yorkists.

== Early life ==
Born at Folkingham Castle, the eldest son of Henry Beaumont, 5th Baron Beaumont, and orphaned by the age of four, Beaumont became Henry V's ward, who quickly put him in the custody of Henry Beaufort, Bishop of Winchester. On 24 July 1425 his marriage rights were granted by the council to Sir John Radcliffe as part-payment for debts owed him by the crown. He was first summoned to parliament as Lord Beaumont in 1431, and at some point between 1425 and 1436 he married Elizabeth Phelip. She was the daughter and heiress of Sir William Phelip, a knight of the Garter who was recognised as sixth Lord Bardolf. On his death in 1441, Phelip's large East Anglian estates went to his daughter, and so to Viscount Beaumont. This made him a leading figure in the region. Combined with his own inheritance in Leicestershire, he was a figure worthy of the association of William de la Pole, Earl of Suffolk (died 1450), and from there entered the household of King Henry VI. In 1429 Beaumont was knighted by the seven-year-old king on the eve of his coronation and was in France with Henry the following year. Dr. John Watts has suggested that, as a royal ward, he may have been brought up in the king's household as a young man, and that his later generous treatment was a consequence of this. Watts noted that a council act of 1425 brought wards of his status 'permanently about the king.'

== Royal service ==
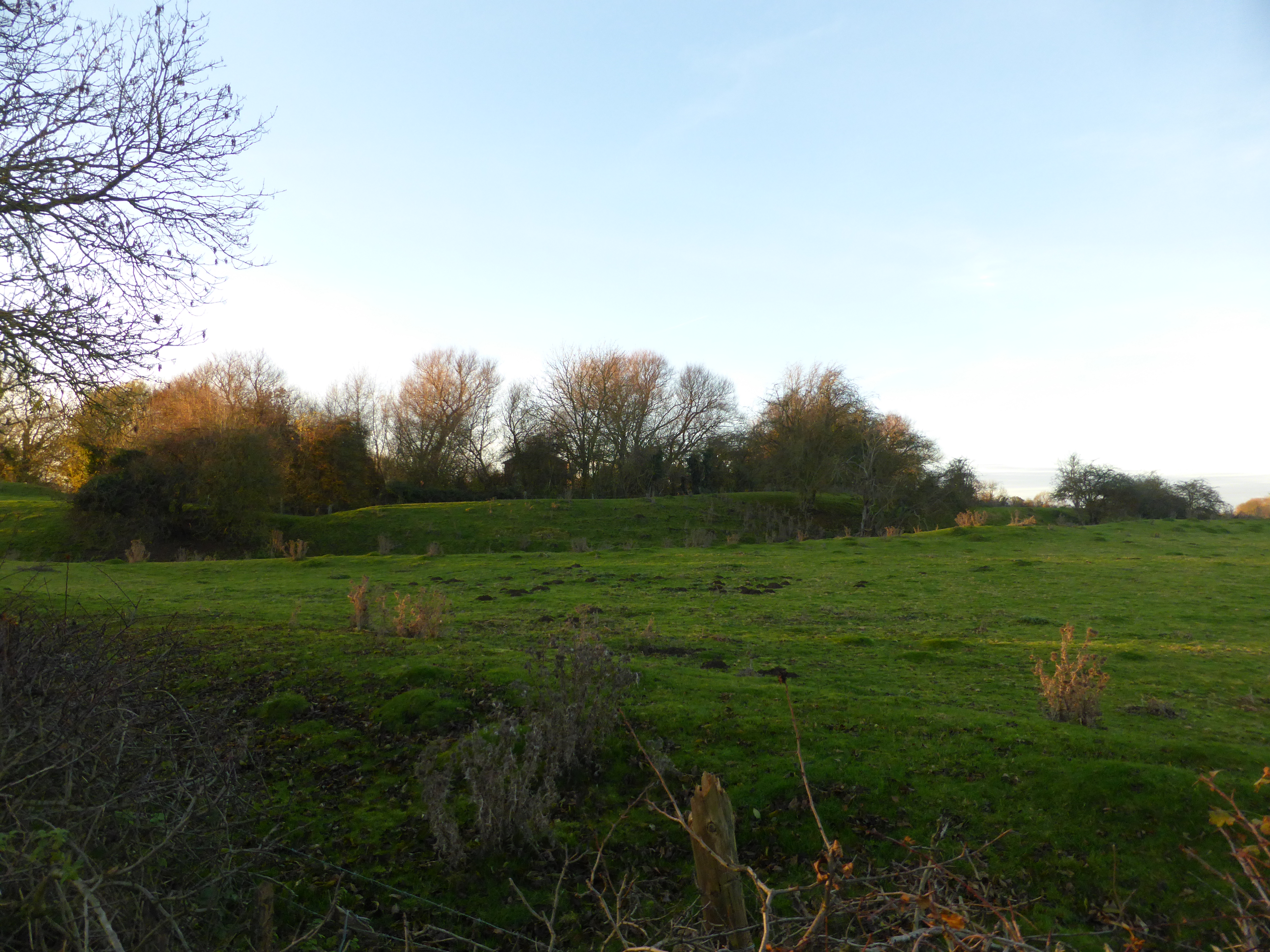
All that remains of Beaumont's birthplace, Folkingham Castle, today

His first major activity on the king's behalf was in France with the king's uncle, the duke of Gloucester in June–July 1436, which had the goal of relieving Calais, in a short, sharp campaign; albeit using the largest English army seen on French soil since Henry V's campaign. He briefly reinforced the Duke of York in Normandy, but all returned to England in late July 1437. For this service he was granted the county of Boulogne in reward; he was not, however, to ever return, even though the earl of Warwick had named him as one of the preferred nobles to accompany him back to France that year to relieve York. On 5 January the following year (by now a 'prominent Household servant,' according to Ralph Griffiths) he was made steward of the Duchy of Lancaster and steward of Leicester, Castle Donington, and Higham Ferrers. In 1439 he was sworn onto the king's council, which was effectively running the country during the king's minority, and in 1446 he was 'intimately involved' in peace negotiations with the French. In 1445, he was appointed Lord High Constable, an envoy to France that same year beginning those negotiations, and five years later, to the Scots.

In June 1457 he was personally responsible for intervening in the activities of Bishop Pecock, a virulent anti-Lollard. However, his virulence led to suspicions of heresy, which resulted in Beaumont's instigation of a formal examination into the bishop's sermons and writings; Peckock agreed to recant and abjured his heresy in November 1457, resigning his bishopric a year later.

=== Royal favour ===
By 1440 he was firmly in the king's favour, being made in succession the first ever English viscount as Viscount Beaumont (1440), possibly because by then Boulogne was effectively lost to him and then granted royal lands in East Anglia, further official positions in royal castles, Lord Great Chamberlain, appointed a Knight of the Garter and the feudal Viscountcy of Beaumont in France. In 1445 he was made premier viscount, and granted precedence over any other- as-yet unmade- viscounts. These consistent promotions and favouritism have been the subject of some speculation by historians; John Watts has questioned why he 'attracted such an extraordinary heap of honours and perquisites from the crown in these years.' He suggests that as a major noble in East Anglia- with all the territorial and regional significance that meant- was enough to make him worthy of promotion. Beaumont commissioned a contemporary manuscript on chivalry, Knyghthode and Bataile, an adaption of Vegetius for presentation to the king, and was also a major benefactor of Queens' College, Cambridge, which the king had granted by charter to his wife Queen Margaret in 1448.

== Second marriage ==
Elizabeth Phelip, Beaumont's first wife, died by October 1441, and within two years he married Katherine Neville, the dowager Duchess of Norfolk. Katherine Neville was noble in her own right, being sister of Richard Neville, Earl of Salisbury, and of Cecily Neville, Duchess of York. Thus, this marriage would have been considered a great marital prize, bringing him further territorial and financial augmentation.

== Political career ==
Beaumont was fully involved in the political crises that punctuated the reign of Henry VI: Griffiths has labelled him one of 'a small group of like-minded men, led by Suffolk' who could work for the king whether in council or on royal progress, although his attendance at council seems to have become more sporadic by 1443. As Steward of England, he personally- although accompanied by, for example, other lords such as Buckingham and the earl of Salisbury- arrested Humphrey, duke of Gloucester for treason, in Bury St Edmunds 18 February 1447. Throughout the subsequent period of foreign catastrophe which, to contemporaries, came to symbolise the failure of Suffolk's government in the late 1440s, Beaumont not only supported the duke's policy but backed him during his impeachment. With Suffolk's fall in 1450, it has been described as 'rather surprising' that Beaumont did not fall with him, having 'been involved in some of the regime's most unpopular activities.' For instance, he was a close associate and a 'protector' of the 'headstrong' Sir William Tailboys (whom Griffiths also called 'knave-in-chief') when Tailboys attempted to assassinate Lord Cromwell in broad daylight in November 1449. He had also suffered a minor assault on his Boston manor the previous year, but it is likely that he was seen as more impartial at the time than he has seen since. Indeed, far from suffering from his patron's fall, he was appointed to Suffolk's old position of Lord Chamberlain of England, although only for three weeks.

At the outbreak of Jack Cade's Rebellion, he was commissioned on 10 June 1450 to reinforce London, and accompanied Henry VI back to the capital in July. Later, with the duke of Buckingham negotiated with the rebels at Blackheath, offering them royal pardons.

At the time of the duke of Suffolk's murder, Beaumont had been an associate of the by now recalcitrant Richard, duke of York, having been one of the duke's feoffees in May 1436 and March 1441, and possibly even acting as the duke's councillor on occasion. He had also joined York on the king's council during York's first Protectorate (March 1453 – January 1454). But as York drew further from the court, so Beaumont appears to have moved towards it; although he appears to have not been present at the first battle of St Albans in 1455, he had already stood with the king against York at the latter's stand-off with king at Dartford in 1452, and then sat in judgment on some of his men. He eventually joined the anti-Neville faction at court; although his wife was a Neville, her family had by now aligned themselves with the duke of York. He was amongst the party of lords that reported to parliament that the king was sick and they 'coud not rouse him' in March 1454. He was also an arbitrator between York and the king's party, headed by the duke of Somerset after the king's recovery in 1454; although Griffiths says not a 'strictly impartial' one. Indeed, Griffiths suggests that his appointment to the council on 15 April 1454, after the king's recovery and York's dismissal, was part of a concerted attempt to 're-balance' the council after the protectorate. He was even reported (although wrongly) to have been recruiting an army to march against London in 1454. He was one of the few Lords Temporal to remain in Henry VI's council in the closing years of the decade, by which time he was the queen's chief steward. He was also part of the royal commission set up by parliament in July 1455 to examine royal household expenditure; the trust the Queen placed in him was demonstrated on 28 January 1457 when he was appointed to the council of the young Prince of Wales, which had responsibility for his estate management, expenditure, personnel, and administration.

His loyalty the crown was such that in 1460 the Yorkists proclaimed him one of their most mortal enemies among the king's supporters. They also claimed that Beaumont, along with the earls of Wiltshire and Shrewsbury, orchestrated the Yorkists' attainder at the 1459 Coventry parliament, in order to seize the Yorkists' lands. It is likely that they were the public focus of the Yorkists' enmity in a way that Henry VI's queen (to whom he was a personal adviser), Margaret of Anjou could not be.

== Wealth and estates ==
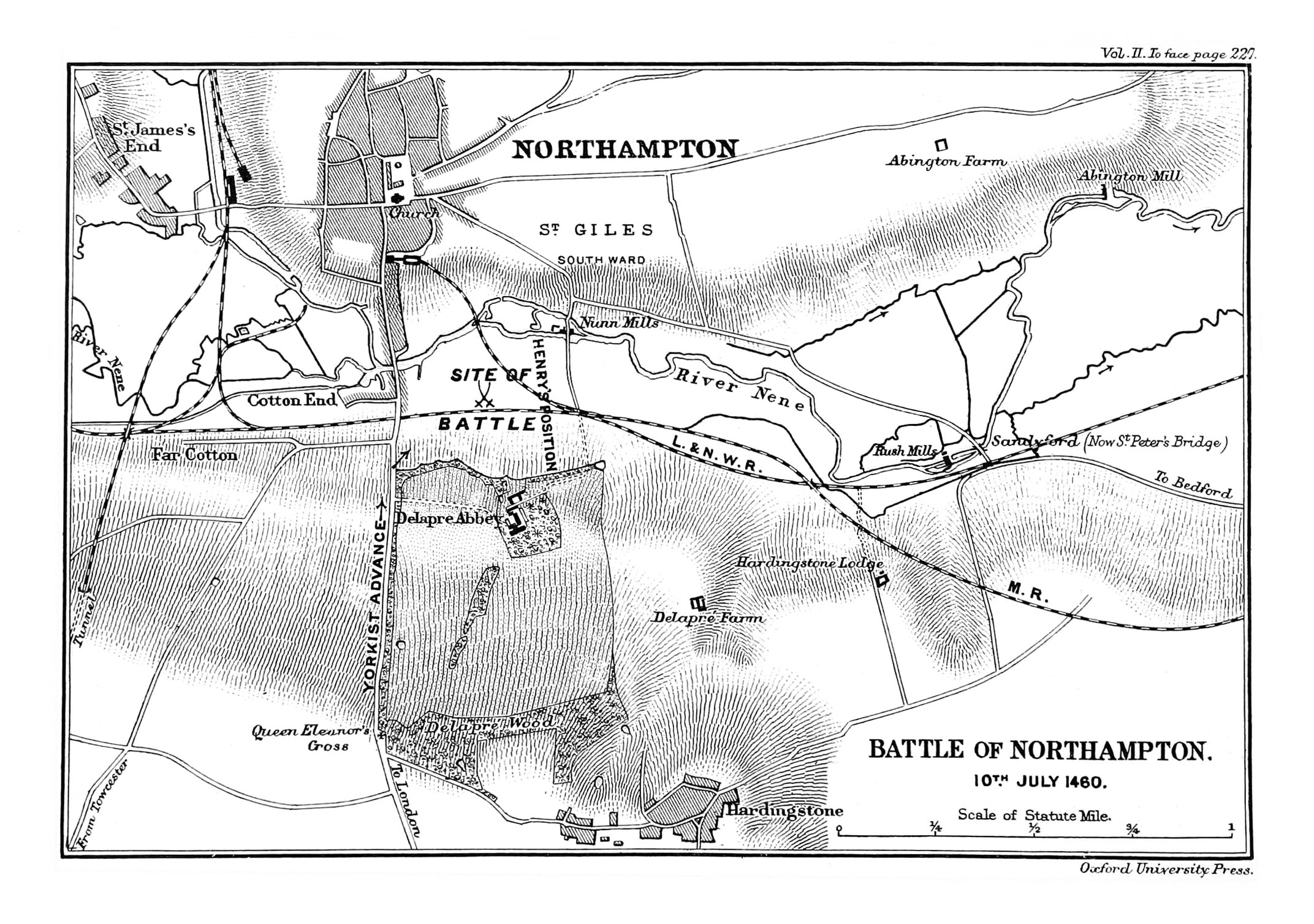
Map of the Battle of Northampton

In 1444, further expanding his wealth, he bought the reversion of Sir Thomas Erdington's estates, as the latter was dying with no heir. Like other lords involved in the fall of Gloucester in 1447, he benefitted immensely from the subsequent redistribution of the duke's lands.

== Death and legacy ==
His allegiance to the Lancastrian regime remained strong enough for him to take arms against the House of York, and eventually cost him his life. Commanding the central battle of the king's army he fell, with the duke of Buckingham and Lord Egremont whilst forming a human shield in defence of the king, against the victorious Yorkists in the battle of Northampton on 10 July 1460. Even though the king had fallen into Yorkist hands, Beaumont was not attainted, and his son was allowed to enter into his inheritance. Presumably in an attempt to reconcile his family to the new regime. This failed, and Beaumont's second son (but who was his heir) – the by now second Viscount fought against the victorious army of the Yorkist king, Edward IV at the battle of Towton in March the next year.

== Family ==
His children include:

- William Beaumont, 2nd Viscount Beaumont
- Joan Beaumont, wife of John Lovell, 8th Baron Lovel, mother of Francis Lovell, 1st Viscount Lovell. Her second husband was William Stanley (died 1495)

Political offices
Preceded by –	Lord Great Chamberlain; 1440–1460	Succeeded by –
Preceded by –	Lord High Constable; 1445–1450	Succeeded by The Duke of Somerset
Peerage of England
New creation	Viscount Beaumont; 1440–1460	Succeeded by William Beaumont
Preceded by Henry Beaumont	Baron Beaumont; 1413–1460	Succeeded by William Beaumont
