= Loveday (arbitration) =

Day of arbitration in medieval England

In medieval England, a loveday (Latin: dies amoris; French: jour d'amour) was a day assigned to mediate between parties and resolve legal differences under arbitration rather than common law. They were held between the thirteenth and seventeenth centuries, by which time they had died out.

== Origins ==
Marc Bloch pointed out in his Feudal Society that even in a relatively young country such as England, by the year 1000, charters 'abound' with not just litigants, but individuals creating their own systems of mediation and arbitration. The earliest known usage of the word 'loveday' is from 1290, although in the early years of its existence it appears to have been less of a legal and more of a religious day, devoted to Christian charity. A hundred years later, Chaucer described it as being symbolised by hand-holding and the renewal of friendship. M.T Clanchy traced the loveday back to a twelfth-century maxim of 'agreement prevails over law, and love over judgement' as the most public and most local of mediated settlements.

== Mechanics ==
In 'loveday', 'love' meant concord or a settlement, and 'day' as a legal term meant a case-opening rather than a twenty-four hour period. There were few, if any restrictions on the kind of business that the loveday could address, as long as the court had authorised it, and this included cases that were pending at a higher court. The results of the loveday could vary; often they broke down (including a celebrated affair in 1411, when on their way to their own loveday, one party ambushed his opponent, with 500 armed men), or they could result in feasts being held, not just for the protagonists, but which the entire manor attended.

== Later middle ages ==
From the later thirteenth century, a loveday gradually became a day where legal redress could be obtained. It was called the dies amoris by Bracton (Latin being the legal lingua franca), and in the contemporary book of manorial law, the Court Baron in the French, jour d'amour. It was a court-appointed day, although the details (time, place, etc.) were up to the litigants to decide. Historians have since debated the extent to which the growth of lovedays was a reflection of the decline in royal authority; Christine Carpenter has suggested that until the fourteenth century the King's writ was sufficient to keep the peace, whilst Edward Powell proposed that, actually, an efficient means of legal self-sufficiency (particularly the means to resolve one's own disputes) was essential particularly if the crown was weak, as was the case for much of the fifteenth century, during the Wars of the Roses.

== Notable instances ==
- 1458: A Loveday was held at St Paul's Cathedral between King Henry VI, Queen Margaret, and the duke of York and other warring nobles in the early years of the Wars of the Roses, in an unsuccessful attempt to avert all-out civil war.
- 1533: During the conquest of Chile, the feuding between the Conquistadors Francisco Pizarro and Diego de Almagro was resolved in Cuzco by means of a religious Loveday.
