= C. A. J. Armstrong =

English historian (1909-1994)

- Born: 25 June 1909; Dover, England
- Died: 9 August 1994 (aged 85); Boars Hill, Oxfordshire
- Known for: Lecturer, historian
- Spouse: Elizabeth Tyler (m. 1953)

Academic background
- Education: Harrow School
- Alma mater: Hertford College, Oxford

Academic work
- Discipline: Medieval English History, Medieval Burgundy, the Wars of the Roses, the medieval nobility
- Institutions: Hertford College, Oxford

Charles Arthur John Armstrong (25 June 1909 – 9 August 1994) was a leading post-war English historian, known for his studies of the First Battle of St Albans and the medieval Duchy of Burgundy.

== Early life and discovery of the Mancini MS ==
Educated at Harrow School, he became one of a district group of English historians from Oxford University, along with K. B. McFarlane and E.F. Jacob. On leaving Oxford, he worked briefly for the Diplomatic Service and it was whilst working in this capacity in Lille Municipal Library in 1934 that he discovered the until-then lost manuscript of Dominic Mancini's account of the reign of Edward V and the accession of his uncle, Richard III in the summer of 1483. He presented a description of this in The Times the same year, and then proceeded to translate and transcribe the manuscript. Since described as 'a model of precise scholarship,' it was published by the Oxford University Press as The Usurpation of Richard III in July 1936.

== Career ==
He joined Hertford College as a Tutor in Modern History the following year, and taught there for the next thirty years, eventually being elected a Fellow of the college. Many of his postgraduate students went on to have notable careers as historians themselves. His career was not without incident: 'intolerant of cant or hypocrisy,' wrote Saul, he would prefer to leave the college's High Table and dine with the undergraduates if he disapproved of the dinner company forced upon him. He published articles widely; the article being the vehicle of choice in the period, he was, in Nigel Saul's words, 'by nature a miniaturist.' His interests ranged from the piety of Cecily Neville, Duchess of York, to the coronation ceremonies of Yorkist kings, to the First Battle of St Albans; his detailed analysis of the latter, according to Michael Hicks, can be considered 'the last word' on the subject.

== Personal life ==
Armstrong married to another scholar, Elizabeth Tyler, in 1953. She was Emerita Fellow of Somerville College, Oxford, who herself wrote upon sixteenth-century France. He died on 9 August 1994 at the age of eighty-five.

== Selected bibliography ==
- The Usurpation of Richard the Third: Dominicus Mancinus ad Angelum Catonem de Occupatione Regni Anglie per Riccardum Tercium Libellus, Oxford University Press, 1936.
- 'Some examples of the distribution and the speed of news in England at the time of Wars of the Roses,' in Hunt, R.W., Pantin, W.A., Southern, R.W. (eds.), Studies in medieval history presented to Frederick Maurice Powicke, Oxford, 1948.
- ‘Politics and the Battle of St. Albans, 1455’, Bulletin of the Institute of Historical Research, 1960.
- England, France and Burgundy in the fifteenth century, London, 1983.
- 'Some examples of the distribution and speed of news in England at the time of the Wars of the Roses,' Medieval History, 1991.
- 'Les ducs de Bourgogne, interprètes de la pensée politique du XVe siècle,' Annales de Bourgogne, 1995.
