= William Beaumont, 2nd Viscount Beaumont =

English noble (1438–1507)

William Beaumont, 2nd Viscount Beaumont (April 1438 – 19 December 1507) was an English nobleman, soldier and landowner who was a leading supporter of the Lancastrian faction during the Wars of the Roses.

He was the son of John Beaumont, 1st Viscount Beaumont and Elizabeth, daughter of Sir William Phelip. He was born at Edenham, Lincolnshire. Although his exact date of birth is not recorded, parish records show the date of his baptism as 23 April 1438.

== Wars of the Roses ==
Sir William led an uneventful life until the feud between the houses of York and Lancaster broke into open bloodshed. While he always claimed in life "...to let each man place his feet in the soil as the good lord intended..."(Bale, Robert (1461). De Præfectis et Consulibus Londini.)), he ultimately sided with the Lancastrians.

=== Battles and land issues ===
He fought in several of the major battles of the Wars of the Roses. He was probably knighted before the Battle of Northampton, where his father was killed. He fought at the Battle of Towton, the bloodiest battle ever fought on English soil, but was taken prisoner and attainted along with other prominent Lancastrian lords. Beaumont obtained a general pardon two days before Christmas, but all his lands were declared forfeit and granted to Lord Hastings. This action erected a permanent barrier to any reconciliation with King Edward.

After the restoration of Henry VI in November 1470, King Henry revoked the bill of attainder and restored Sir William's lands and titles. However, the following March, he opposed Edward's landing at Ravenspur. He joined forces with the Duke of Exeter, but they were too weak and were forced to stand aside at Newark and allow Edward to march south to London.

Beaumont fought under Oxford at the Battle of Barnet, but suspecting treachery, they fled. With the Yorkist Edward IV on the throne again, Beaumont was once more stripped of his lands and titles.

Between 1471 and 1474, he was continually at war, holding (amongst other bastions), St Michael's Mount along with John de Vere, 13th Earl of Oxford, for the Lancastrians in 1473. However, misfortune continued to dog Sir William, and in 1474, he was taken prisoner and imprisoned at Hammes. Released by Sir James Blount in 1484, he landed at Milford Haven with Henry Tudor and fought against Richard III at the Battle of Bosworth Field on 22 August 1485.

Sir William's lands and titles were restored (for the second time) by act of Parliament on 7 November 1485.

=== Mental illness ===
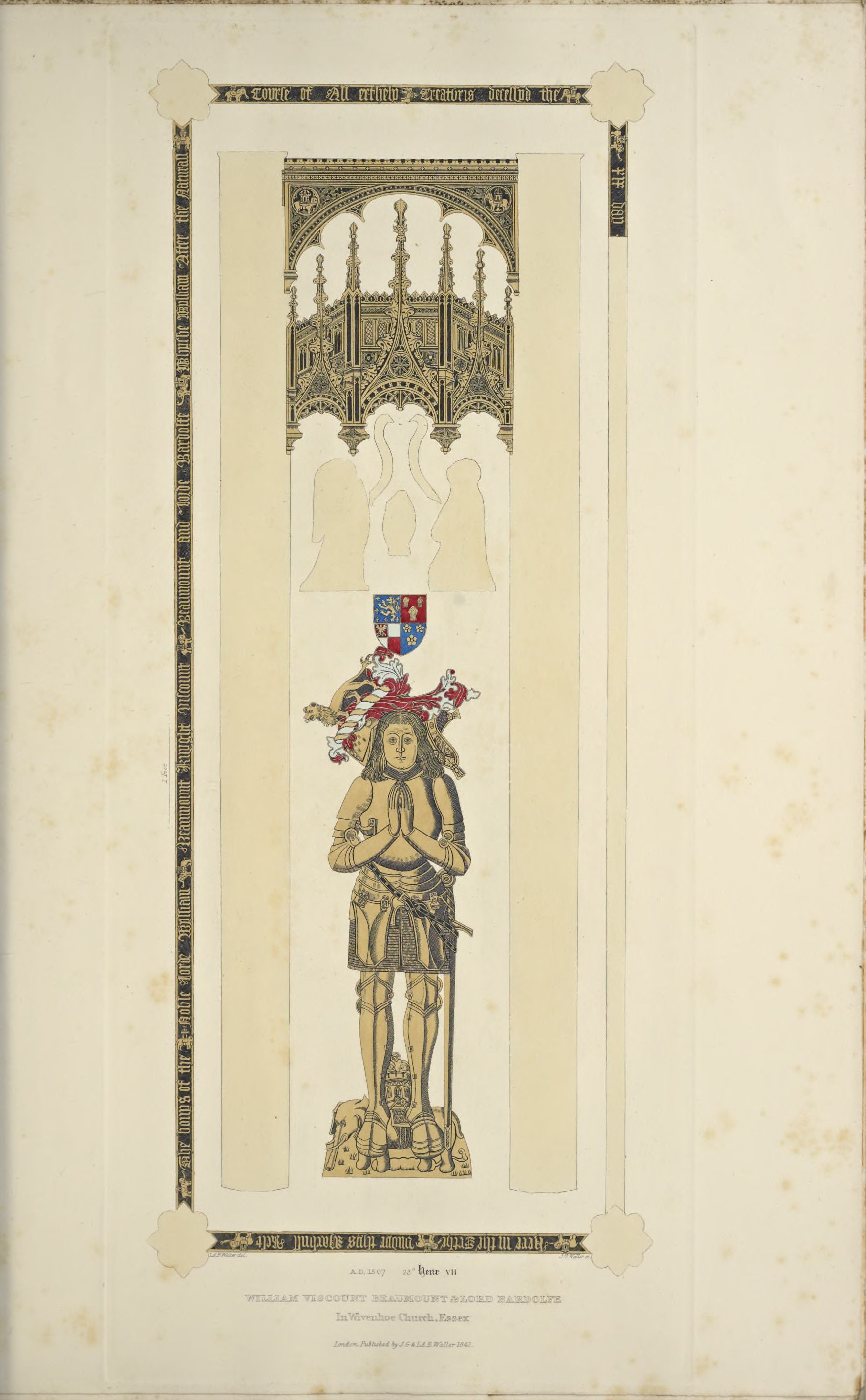
Memorial brass to Beaumont in Wivenhoe Church, Essex

Following his military career, by 1487, Beaumont was reported to be incapacitated by mental illness. Parliament ruled that he no longer had "sadness [seriousness] or discretion to rule and keep" his estates, and gave Beaumont's former comrade-in-arms John de Vere, 13th Earl of Oxford control of Beaumont's lands during his lifetime. He and his family lived in the care of his friend for his remaining years. The precise nature of Beaumont's mental illness is not known, but two sources suggest that he was not completely incapacitated. He was witness to a bond in 1488, which suggests he was capable of lucidity at that time. In 1498, an inscription written in his name bequeathed a book to his wife.

He died on 19 December 1507, aged 69, at Oxford's home at Wivenhoe, where he is buried. His widow later married Oxford. The Beaumonts were one of only seven great families who remained irreconcilably anti-Yorkist throughout the Wars of the Roses.

== Family ==
Beaumont married firstly on 6 August 1462, Joan daughter of Humphrey Stafford, 1st Duke of Buckingham. This marriage was set aside before 1477. He married secondly Elizabeth Scrope, daughter and coheir of Sir Richard Scrope, the second son of Henry Scrope, 4th Baron Scrope of Bolton, by Eleanor, the daughter of Norman Washbourne.

At least one child was born to his mistress Jayne Stephens circa 1459, by the name of John Francis Beaumont. Whilst Sir William never recognised the child as his heir, he did provide for the child's education and welfare.

Upon the death of Sir William, the Viscountcy of Beaumont became extinct in both England and France and due to discord and fighting between his great-nephews, the title fell into abeyance.

== Notes ==
Peerage of England
Preceded by John Beaumont	Viscount Beaumont; 1460–1507	Extinct
Preceded by John Beaumont	Baron Beaumont; 1460–1507	Abeyant
