= Prior of Lanthony Secunda =

Head of Lanthony Secunda Priory

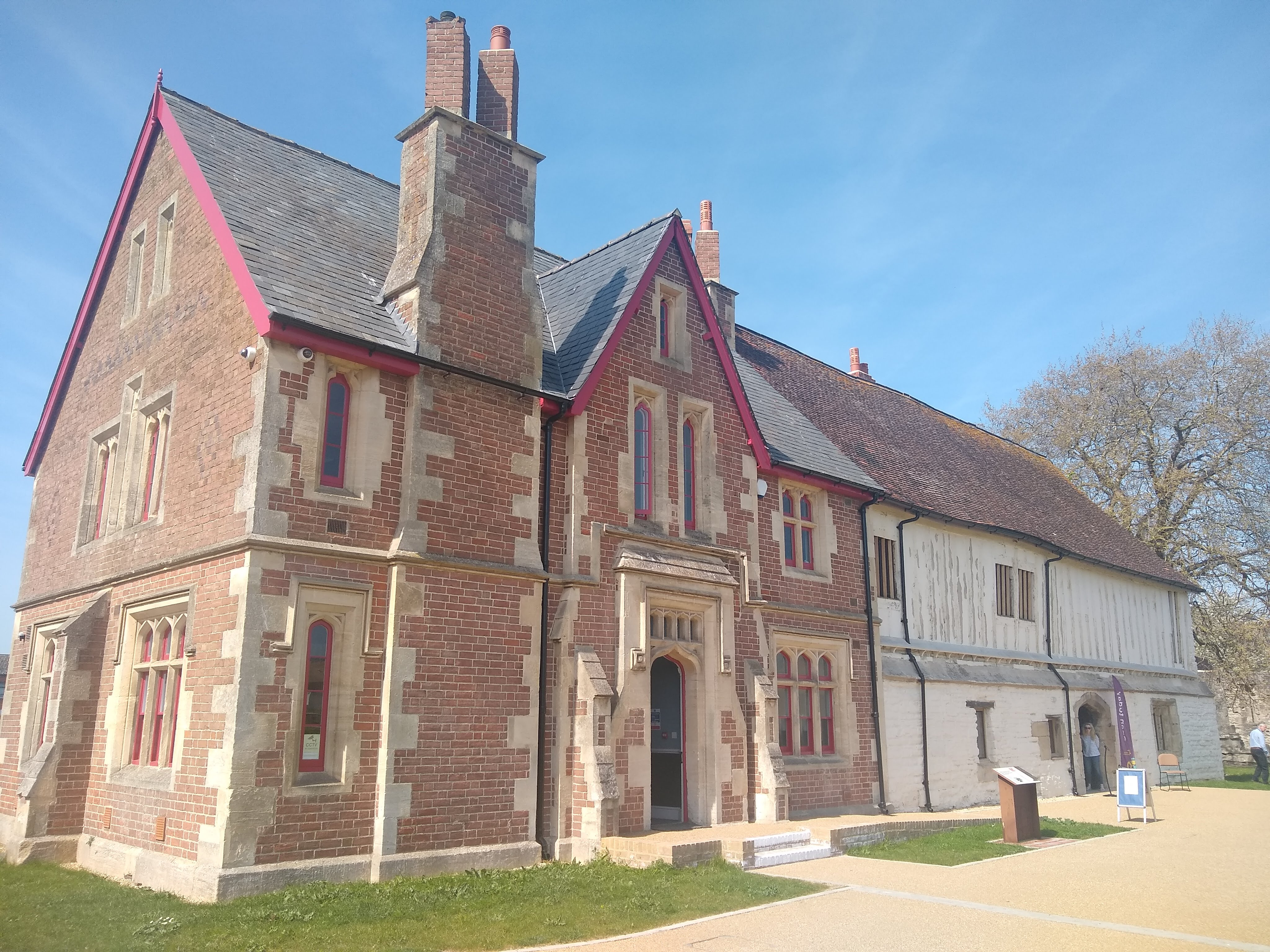
Lanthony Secunda Priory

The prior of Lanthony Secunda Priory was the head of the house and, from its foundation in 1137 until it became independent in 1205, also prior of Llanthony Prima.

The first prior of Lanthony Secunda, and the third of Llanthony Prima, was Robert de Braci, who died shortly after the church at Lanthony Secunda was consecrated. The last prior, Richard Hempsted, surrendered the priory in 1538 during the dissolution of the monasteries.

== Background ==
Llanthony Priory began as a hermitage on the edge of the Black Mountains at the beginning of the twelfth century and into a monastery of Augustinian canons c. 1118. In 1136, amid the lawlessness that followed the death of Henry I, most of the canons fled Llanthony and founded Lanthony Secunda outside Gloucester as a cell of Llanthony Prima. Lanthony Secunda remained a cell of Llanthony Prima, with a shared prior, until it became independent in 1205.

In 1481 Edward IV granted Lanthony Secunda, then under Henry Deane, a charter making Llanthony Prima a cell of its former daughter house. The charter required that Lanthony Secunda maintain at Llanthony Prima a dative prior and four canons.

== Priors ==
From	Until	Incumbent	Notes
1131	1137	Robert de Braci	Third prior of Llanthony Prima and first prior of Lanthony Secunda. Died in 1137.
1137	1150	William of Wycombe	Elected in late 1137. Forced to resign in 1150.
1150	c. 1169×1174	Clement of Llanthony	Formerly sub-prior of Llanthony. Unanimously elected in 1150.
c. 1174	c. 1186×1189	Roger of Norwich	Formerly sub-prior of Llanthony. First occurs as prior in 1174. Resigned or died c. 1186×1189.
c. 1185×1189	1203	Geoffrey de Henlaw	First occurs as prior c. 1185×1189. Appointed bishop of St Davids in 1203 and resigned as prior. Died in 1214.
c. 1203	c. 1205	Martin	Eighth prior of Llanthony Prima and sixth prior of Lanthony Secunda. The two houses separated during his priorship. Elected to continue as prior of Llanthony Prima.
c. 1205	c. 1207	Walter of Monmouth	
c. 1207	c. 1216	Gilbert	
c. 1217	1240	John of Hempsted	Died in December 1240
c. 1241	1251	Godfrey of Banbury	Believed to have succeeded John in 1241. Likely to be the unnamed prior who resigned in 1251.
1251		Everard (also Edward)	Succeeded in 1251
c. 1260×1265	c. 1264	Godfrey of Banbury	Reinstated or reelected.
c. 1265		William of Ashwell	First occurs in either Oct 1260×Jun 1261 or July 1263×Aug 1265. Last occurs in 1279.
1283	1300	Walter of Markley (also Marckleye, Marcley, Martleg, Martleya)	Elected in March 1283 and assaulted by a fellow canon shortly after his election. Last recorded in 1300.
1300	1301	Thomas of Gloucester	Elected in 1300, but objected to on grounds that he was excommunicated. Resigned in 1301.
1301	c. 1322	John of Chandos	First recorded as acting prior in June 1300. Last occurs in 1320.
c. 1322	1324	William of Pendebury (also Penebury, Pyndebury)	Probably succeeded in 1322. Forced to resign by the king in March 1324.
1324	1324	Adam of Helnak	Granted custody of the priory by the king in May 1324 after a disputed election.
1324		Robert of Gloucester	Elected in 1324 but never installed as prior. Election was declared void by the bishop of Winchester in 1325 and William of Pendebury was reinstated.
1326	1362	William of Pendebury	Reinstated in September 1326. Died in November 1362.
1362	1377	Simon of Brockworth	Elected in November 1362. Died in February 1377.
1377	1401	William of Chiriton (also Cheriton)	Elected in February 1377. Previously served as proctor of the priory in Ireland, 1360 to 1364. Died in 1401.
1401	1408	John Lymnor (also Lymnon, Lymnour, Lymynour)	Elected in 1401. Died in August 1408.
1408	1436	John Wyche	Elected in August 1408. Died in April 1436.
1436	1457	John Garland (also Garlonde, Gerland)	Elected in May 1436. Died by in October 1457.
1457	1466	John Hayward (also Heyward)	Elected in October 1457. Ceased being prior c. February 1460, shortly after being released from prison. Died in 1487.
1466	c. 1466×1467	John Schoyer (also Shoyer)	
1467	1501	Henry Deane (also Dean, Denny, Deen)	Likely succeeded Schoyer in April 1461. Resigned in May 1501 to become archbishop of Canterbury. Died in 1503. Llanthony Prima became a daughter house of Lanthony Secunda during his term.
1501	1525	Edmund Forest (also Forrest, Shyar)	Elected in August 1501. Likely removed as prior in 1525.
1525	1538	Richard Hempsted (also Harte, Hart)	First occurs as prior in 1525. Acknowledged royal supremacy in 1534, surrendered the priory in March 1538. Died in 1545.
