= Walter of Markley =

13th century prior of Lanthony Secunda

- Prior of Lanthony Secunda
- Church: Lanthony Secunda Priory
- Installed: 1 April 1283
- Term ended: 1300
- Predecessor: William of Ashwell
- Successor: Thomas of Gloucester

Walter of Markley (also Marckleye, Marcley, Martleg, Martleya) was prior of Lanthony Secunda from 1 April 1283. He is last recorded as prior in 1300. His successor, Thomas of Gloucester, was elected the same year.

== Early life ==
There is no town named Markley near Gloucester. Walter instead probably came from a prominent Gloucester family, and several members are recorded in contemporary town records. Two, Hugh of Markley and William Markley, witnessed charters of the priory during Walter's priorship.

== Prior of Lanthony Secunda ==
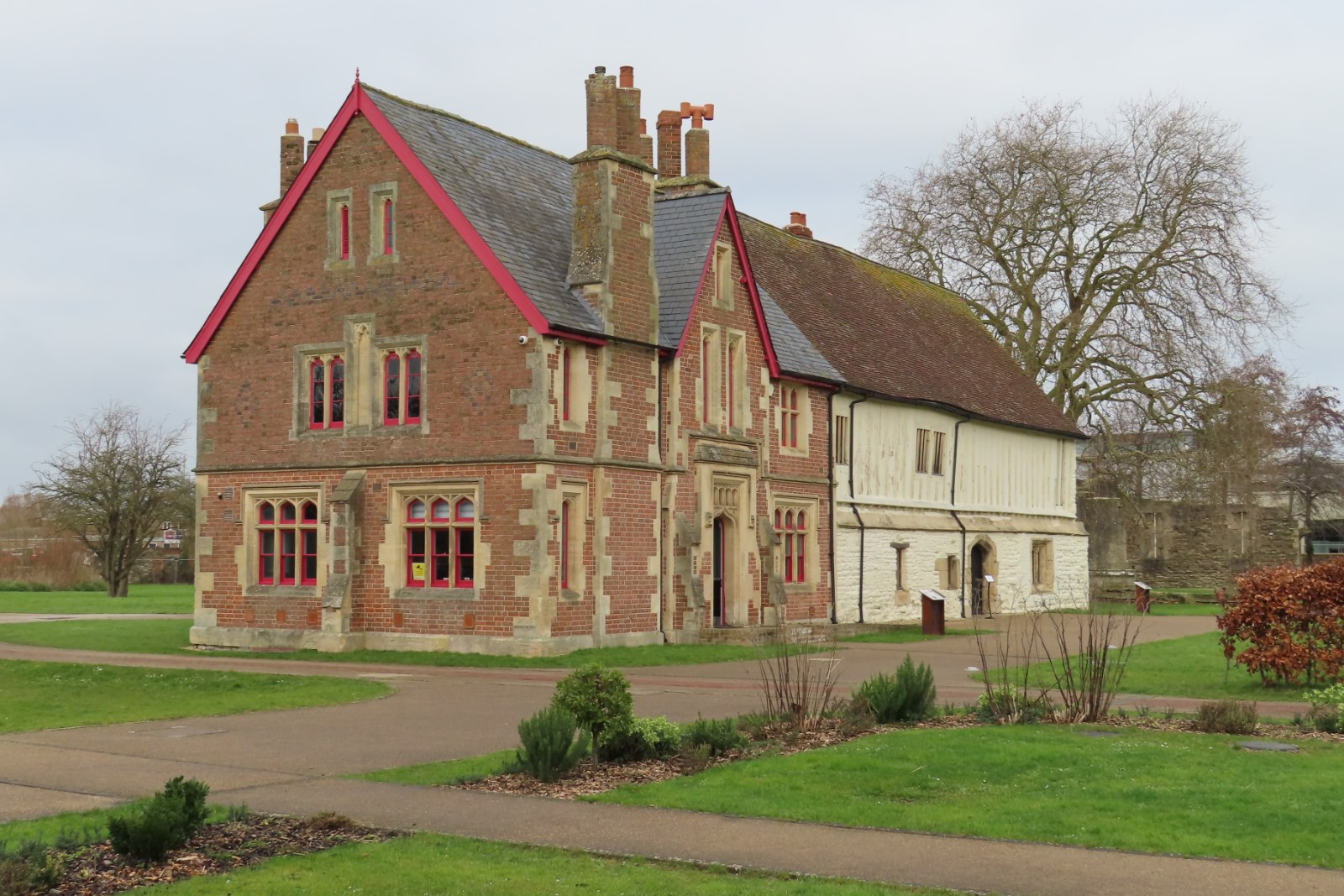
Lanthony Secunda Priory

Walter was confirmed as prior by Godfrey Giffard, the bishop of Worcester, on 18 March 1283. On 1 April, Giffard issued a mandate to the archdeacon of Gloucester to install him. No comment was recorded in Giffard's episcopal register.

Shortly after his election Walter was assaulted by John of Worcester, a canon of Lanthony Secunda, who bit his finger and drew blood. The canon remained obstinate and Giffard ordered that he be kept "in prison under iron chains" until he repented. He was to receive only "bread, indifferent ale, pottage, and a pittance of meat or fish".

During his priorship, the trend towards reliance on the borough court of Gloucester rather than the priory's own court continued, leading to the dissolution or marginalisation of the priory court.

In May 1284 Giffard, in the course of his episcopal duties, visited the priory for two days. No comment was recorded, suggesting nothing was wrong. He visited again in 1290, but the priorship was exempted from visitation in 1298.

In 1291, the Taxation of Pope Nicholas IV recorded the income of the priory's English possessions as £109 15s. In another year during Walter's priorship, the priory received £81 5s 7d from its Irish possessions. Together, these sums amounted to £191 0s 7d, equivalent to £333,500 in 2025.
