= Cora Scofield =

Historian of medieval England

Academic background
- Education: University of Chicago
- Thesis: A study of the Court of Star Chamber : largely based on manuscripts in the British Museum and the Public Record Office (1900)

Cora Louise Scofield (February 6, 1870 – March 10, 1962) was an American historian of late medieval England.

== Early life and education ==
Cora Scofield was born in Washington, Iowa in 1870, the second of two daughters of a Union Army veteran, General Hiram Scofield, and his wife Amelia. She attended Vassar College, graduating in 1890, which she followed with a period of study at the University of Oxford in 1891-92. She graduated with a PhD from the University of Chicago in 1898.

== Career ==
Scofield published her doctoral thesis, A Study of the Court of Star Chamber, in 1900. She then focused her studies on the reign of Edward IV of England. In 1923, she published her two volume The Life and Reign of Edward the Fourth. Historian and archivist Charles Johnson wrote that it was "likely to be the standard authority on that period of English history which his life covers, and not soon to be superseded." He considered that "[t]he most striking merit of Miss Scofield's work is her treatment of foreign relations. ... she makes constant use of French and Flemish sources", although he regretted that, "in view of the excellence of her work", she did not have access to some sources. Even after Charles Ross published his Edward IV in 1974, Scofield's work has continued to remain a vital resource for scholars.

Scofield died in Boston on March 10, 1962.

== Selected publications ==
- Scofield, Cora Louise (1900), A study of the Court of Star Chamber, Chicago: University of Chicago Press, OCLC 213551510
- Scofield, Cora L. (1906). "The Movements of the Earl of Warwick in the Summer of 1464". The English Historical Review. XXI (LXXXIV): 732–737. doi:10.1093/ehr/XXI.LXXXIV.732. ISSN 0013-8266.
- Scofield, Cora L. (1909). "Elizabeth Wydevile in the Sanctuary at Westminster, 1470". The English Historical Review. XXIV (XCIII): 90–91. doi:10.1093/ehr/XXIV.XCIII.90. ISSN 0013-8266.
- Scofield, Cora L. (1914). "The Early Life of John de Vere, thirteenth Earl of Oxford". The English Historical Review. XXIX (CXIV): 228–245. doi:10.1093/ehr/XXIX.CXIV.228. ISSN 0013-8266.
- Scofield, Cora L. (1923). The life and reign of Edward the Fourth, King of England and France and Lord of Ireland. London: Longmans, Green and Co. OCLC 1367922.
