= Charles Johnson (historian) =

British archivist and historian (1870–1961)

Charles Johnson MBE
- Born: 2 May 1870
- Died: 5 November 1961 (aged 91)
- Education: Trinity College, Oxford
- Occupations: Historian; archivist
- Writing career
- Notable awards: Fellow of the British Academy

Charles Johnson, CBE, FBA, FSA, FRHistS (2 May 1870 – 5 November 1961) was an English historian and archivist. A graduate of Trinity College, Oxford, he worked in the Public Record Office from 1893 to 1930. There, he worked on classifying Chancery files and ancient miscellanea, and assisted with the publication of editions of the PRO's records. He also authored several editions of medieval documents, produced monographs, took part in the British Academy's effort to produce a dictionary of medieval Latin, and sat on several academic administration boards. He was appointed a Commander of the Order of the British Empire in 1951 and elected a fellow of the British Academy in 1934.

== Selected works ==
- (editor with Arthur Hughes and C. G. Crump) De Necessariis Observantiis Scaccarii Dialogus, Commonly Called Dialogus de scaccario (Oxford: Clarendon Press, 1902)
- (with Hilary Jenkinson) English Court Hand (Oxford: Clarendon Press, 1915)
- The Public Record Office, Helps for Students of History (London: Society for the Promotion of Christian Knowledge, 1918)
- The Care of Documents and Management of Archives, Helps for Students of History (London: Society for the Promotion of Christian Knowledge, 1919)
- The Mechanical Processes of the Historian, Helps for Students of History (London: Society for the Promotion of Christian Knowledge, 1922)
- (editor) Registrum Hamonis Hethe Diocesis Roffensis A. D. 1319-1352, 2 vols., The Publications of the Canterbury and York Society, nos. 48-49 (Oxford: Oxford University Press for the Canterbury and York Society, 1948)
- (editor) Dialogus de Scaccario: The Course of the Exchequer by Richard, son of Nigel, Treasurer of England and Bishop of London, Nelson Medieval Classics (London: Nelson, 1950)
- (editor, with H. A. Cronne) Regesta Regum Anglo-Normannorum, vol. 2 (Oxford: Clarendon Press, 1956)
- (editor) Nicholas Oresme, De Moneta, Nelson Medieval Classics (London: Nelson, 1956)
- (editor) Hugh the Chanter, History of the Church of York, 1066-1127, Nelson Medieval Classics (London: Nelson, 1961)
