= Thomas of Buckingham =

14th-century English theologian

Thomas of Buckingham was an English theologian in the 14th century. He tried to reconcile the Catholic faith with Pelagianism. He was the chancellor of Exeter Cathedral.
