= John Watts (historian) =

English historian (born 1964)

Professor John Watts FRHistS
- Born: John Lovett Watts; 29 September 1964 (age 62); Middlesex, England
- Title: Professor of Later Medieval History

Academic background
- Education: University of Cambridge
- Thesis: Domestic Politics and the Constitution in the Reign of Henry VI, c. 1435–61 (1991)
- Doctoral advisor: Christine Carpenter

Academic work
- Discipline: History
- Sub-discipline: Late-medieval English history; intellectual history; political history
- Institutions: Merton College, Oxford; Aberystwyth University; Corpus Christi College, Oxford

John Lovett Watts FRHistS (born 29 September 1964) is an English historian specialising in the political history of late-medieval England. He is Professor of Later Medieval History at the University of Oxford and a fellow of Corpus Christi College.

== Career ==
Watts studied for his PhD at the University of Cambridge under Christine Carpenter, researching politics and the English constitution during the reign of King Henry VI, which was awarded in early 1991. He had joined Merton College, Oxford, the previous year as a junior research fellow, and from there became a lecturer at the University of Aberystwyth. He returned to Oxford in 1997, joining Corpus Christi College as a fellow and tutor in medieval history. He has described the context of his interests – Henry VI – as "a famously useless king, who came to the throne as a baby and ruled with astonishing inertness for a further thirty-nine years". In 2014 he was awarded the Title of Distinction of Professor of Later Medieval History.

At Corpus Christi College, Watts served as tutor for admissions from 1999 to 2002, senior tutor from 2008 to 2011, and vice-president from 2014 to 2017. He was chair of the History Faculty Board (head of department) from 2018 to 2021. He also served as the chair of the editorial board of the journal The English Historical Review between 2019 and 2022.

=== Research ===
Watts' first monograph, based on his doctoral research, was published by Cambridge University Press in 1996. According to A. J. Pollard, reviewing the book for The American Historical Review, Watts echoes the judgement of K. B. McFarlane that Henry VI's "second childhood followed the first without the usual interval" and thus the guiding principle of his reign was that "he never once exercised his royal will", leaving others to act in his name. Pollard concludes that the book is a "thorough and consistent study" of late medieval constitutional politics, labelling it a "new Tory interpretation" which should be matched by a "revitalised Whig version" of constitutional history.

Watts' next book was an edited collection entitled The End of the Middle Ages? England in the Fifteenth and Sixteenth Centuries, published by Sutton Publishing in 1998. In her review for The Sixteenth Century Journal, Anne Coldiron highlighted Watts' bookending essays as "some of the best discussion of the problems of periodization" she had seen.

In 2009 Watts published a survey of later medieval European history entitled The Making of Polities as part of Cambridge University Press' Cambridge Medieval Textbooks series. George Garnett, reviewing the work for The English Historical Review, called it "courageous, original and thought-provoking" and "much more than a text-book" despite the title of its parent series. Though Garnett complimented Watts' "mastery of the detail of individual historical examples", he concluded that Watts' "concentration on abstract reification of structures and space" came at a cost to the book's arguments. He suggested that Watts' approach represented "the collective voice of modern French historiography", suggesting that The Making of Polities would have benefited from immersion in academic works in other languages such as German. Garnett further concurred with another reviewer, L. C. Attreed, that Watts' book set itself apart by rejecting "the period's usual characterization of decline and crisis beloved by textbook writers", focusing instead on the development of centralized princely government.

=== Honours and awards ===
In 2010 Watts was awarded a three-year major research fellowship from the Leverhulme Trust for a project entitled 'Renaissance England, 1461–1547'. He is an elected fellow of the Royal Historical Society.

=== Media work ===
Watts has contributed reviews of late medieval history books to the London Review of Books.

== Bibliography ==
- Henry VI and the Politics of Kingship (1996)
- The End of the Middle Ages? England in the Fifteenth and Sixteenth Centuries (1998) (editor)
- Power and Identity in the Middle Ages: Essays in Memory of Rees Davies (2007) (co-editor with Huw Pryce)
- The Making of Polities: Europe, 1300–1500 (2009)
- Political Society in Later Medieval England: A Festschrift for Christine Carpenter (2011) (co-editor with Benjamin Thompson)
- Government and Political Life in England and France, c. 1300 – c. 1500 (2015) (co-editor with Christopher Fletcher and Jean-Philippe Genet)
- History of Universities: Volume XXXII / 1–2: Renaissance College, Corpus Christi College, Oxford; 1450–1600, Volume 32 (2019) (co-editor with Mordechai Feingold)
- The Wars of the Roses: A Medieval Civil War (2025)
