= G. L. Harriss =

British historian (1925–2014)

Gerald Leslie Harriss FBA
- Born: 22 May 1925
- Died: 2 November 2014 (aged 89)
- Other name: G. L. Harriss

Academic background
- Education: Magdalen College, Oxford
- Thesis: The Finances of the Royal Household, 1437–1460 (1953)
- Doctoral advisor: C. A. J. Armstrong
- Other advisor: K. B. McFarlane

Academic work
- Discipline: History
- Sub-discipline: Medieval English history
- Institutions: University of Manchester; University of Durham; Magdalen College, Oxford
- Doctoral students: Christine Carpenter; Rosemary Horrox; Simon Walker
- Notable works: Harriss, Gerald (2005). Shaping the Nation, England 1360–1461. Oxford. ISBN 9780199211197.

Gerald Leslie Harriss (22 May 1925 – 2 November 2014) was an English historian of the Late Middle Ages. His work focused on the parliamentary, financial and administrative history of the period. Harriss was a Fellow of Magdalen College, Oxford.

== Career ==
G. L. Harriss first came up to read Modern History at Magdalen College, Oxford as an undergraduate in 1943 where he was tutored by K. B. McFarlane. After two years in the Royal Navy from 1944 to 1946, he returned to complete his degree and went on to research for a D.Phil. under the supervision of C. A. J. Armstrong, being elected to a Senior Demyship of Magdalen, which he held from 1950 to 1952.

Harriss' first academic post was as an assistant lecturer in the University of Manchester from 1955 to 1956, before he was appointed a lecturer and later Reader in Medieval History in the University of Durham from 1956 to 1967. In 1967, Harriss succeeded McFarlane, who had died suddenly the previous year, as Fellow and Tutor in Modern History of Magdalen College, also serving as College Librarian from 1968 to 1983. From 1990 to 1992, Harriss was Reader in Medieval History in the University of Oxford. Upon his retirement in 1992 he was elected an Emeritus Fellow of Magdalen College.

In 1986, Harriss was elected a Fellow of the British Academy.

Rulers and Ruled in Late Medieval England. Essays presented to Gerald Harriss (Hambledon, 1995), a Festschrift in Harriss' honour, edited by two of his former research students, Rowena E. Archer and Simon Walker, was published in 1995.

Harriss' important contributions to medieval history were based upon his research into the growing financial demands and prerogatives of late medieval English government, which resulted in a series of important articles such as "Fictitious Loans", Ec.HR, 2nd series, 8 (1955-6), pp. 187–99; "Preference at the Medieval Exchequer", BIHR, 30 (1957), pp. 17–40; and "Aids, Loans and Benevolences", Historical Journal, 6 (1963), pp. 1–19. In his magnum opus, King, Parliament and Public Finance in Medieval England to 1369 (Oxford, 1975), Harriss placed the parliamentary-controlled system of royal finance in the context of the emergence of the crown as a corporate body separate from the person of the king, and its role in the development of English political society and the constitution. Harriss later benefited from the work of Simon Walker, particularly in relation to the retinue of John of Gaunt and the development of private forms of political authority alongside that of the crown.

As well as succeeding McFarlane at Magdalen, Harriss also edited a posthumous collection of McFarlane's essays, Lancastrian Kings and Lollard Knights, in 1972. In 1997, Harriss edited Letters to Friends 1940–1966, a collection of McFarlane's correspondence with several of his distinguished students, including R. R. Davies, Karl Leyser, Alan Bennett, and Harriss himself, published privately by Magdalen College.

== Select publications ==
- King, Parliament and Public Finance in Medieval England to 1369, 1975
- Henry V: The Practice of Kingship (ed.), 1985
- Cardinal Beaufort. A Study in Lancastrian Ascendency and Decline, 1988
- 'Political Society and the Growth of Government in Late Medieval England', (journal article) 1993
- Shaping the Nation. England, 1360–1461, 2005

== Related publication ==
- Rulers and Ruled in Late Medieval England. Essays presented to Gerald Harris, 1995
