= Knyghthode and Bataile =

Fifteenth-century English poem

Knyghthode and Bataile is a fifteenth-century verse paraphrase by John Neele of Vegetius Renatus' treatise De Re Militari. Influenced by the years of English occupation of France, and completed circa November 1459 to June 1460, it has been called 'one of the most brilliant military poems of the fifteenth century.' It was published in a modern edition by the Early English Text Society in 1935 and more recently in 2021 by Medieval Institute Publications.

The language and verse of the poem appear to be modelled on Chaucer. Many details which are irrelevant to Medieval warfare were omitted, such as technical information about the Roman Legions, while references to contemporary events and gunpowder were added. According to Christopher Allmand, the author appropriated Vegetius to argue against the traditional view that knights were superior to commoners, attempting to "advance the esteem in which the latter should be held".
