= Christine Carpenter (historian) =

English historian

Professor Christine Carpenter FRHistS
- Born: 7 December 1946 (age 79); Oxford, England
- Other name: Mary Christine Carpenter

Academic background
- Education: Newnham College, Cambridge
- Thesis: Political Society in Warwickshire c. 1401–72 (1976)
- Doctoral advisor: G. L. Harriss

Academic work
- Discipline: History
- Sub-discipline: Medieval English history
- Institutions: New Hall, Cambridge
- Doctoral students: Helen Castor; John Watts

Mary Christine Carpenter FRHistS (born 7 December 1946) is an English historian who was professor of medieval English history at the University of Cambridge.

== Early life and education ==
Carpenter was born on 7 December 1946 in Oxford, England. She received her Bachelor of Arts and Doctor of Philosophy degrees from Newnham College, Cambridge. Her doctoral thesis was titled "Political society in Warwickshire, c.1401-72" and was submitted in 1976. Her doctoral supervisor was G. L. Harriss.

== Academia ==
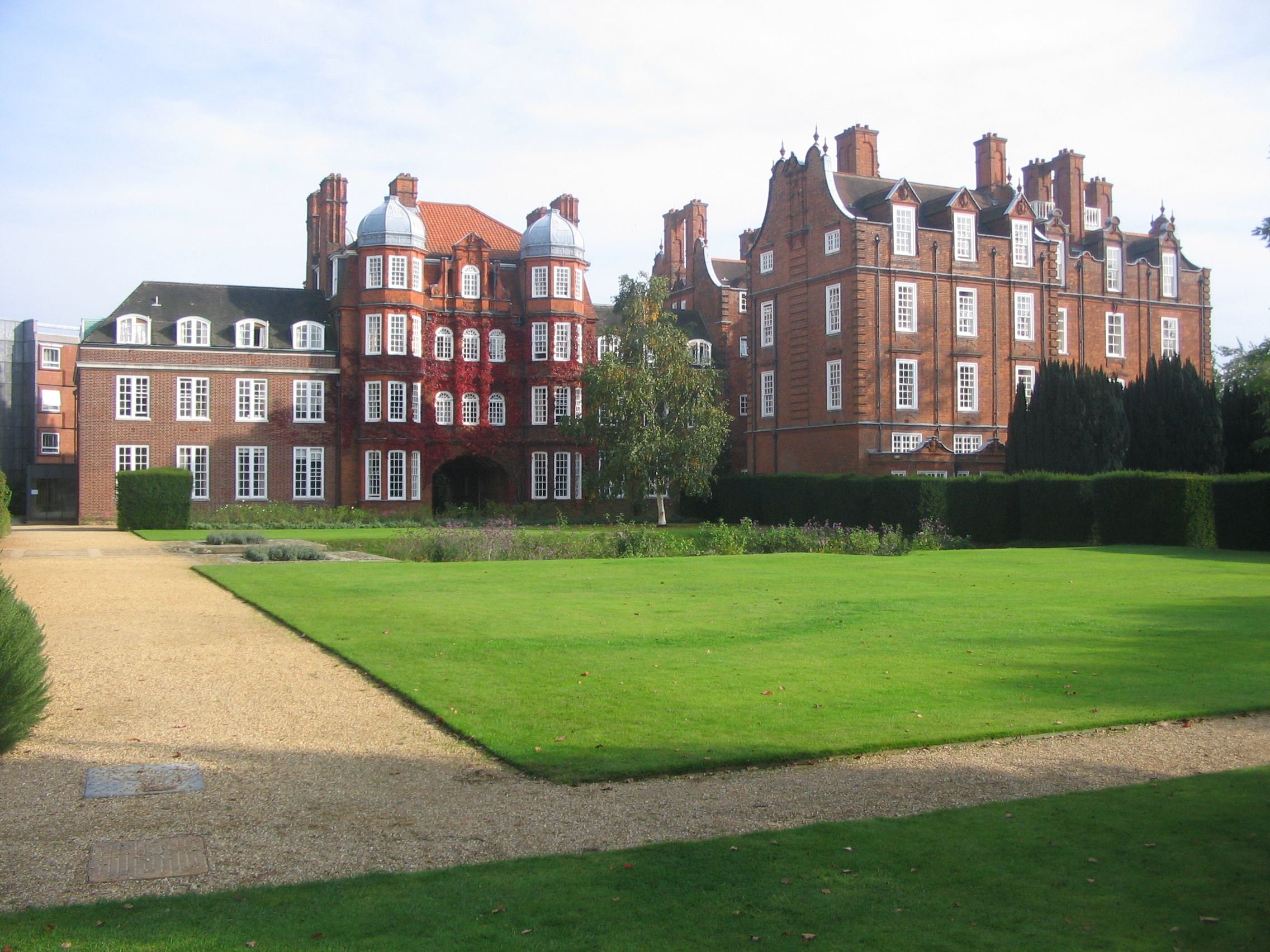
Newnham College, part of the University of Cambridge, with a view of Pfeiffer Arch and the Old Hall building

Carpenter was a freelance tutor and lecturer at the University of Cambridge from 1976 to 1979. In 1979, she was elected a fellow of New Hall, Cambridge. She was additionally a university assistant lecturer from 1983 to 1988 and a university lecturer from 1988 to 1995. She was appointed Reader in Medieval English History in 1995 and made Professor of Medieval English History in 2005.

Carpenter is author and editor of a number of English history books and papers. Her research interests focus on the political and constitutional history of England from 1066 to c. 1500, and in the political, social, economic, religious and cultural history of noble and gentry landowners in that period.

Carpenter supervises postgraduate work on government, politics and landed society from c. 1250 to 1500 and at the undergraduate level she teaches all aspects of English history from c. 1050 to 1500.

Carpenter is the director of an Arts and Humanities Research Council-funded project to complete the calendaring of the 15th-century Inquisitions post mortem, and one of the editors of the Cambridge University Press Studies in Medieval Life and Thought, in addition to serving on other editorial committees.

In June 2012, Carpenter was selected to give the Ford Lectures at the University of Oxford in the 2015–2016 academic year.

== Books and other works ==
- Locality and Polity: A Study of Warwickshire Landed Society 1401–1499 (1992) (winner of the Royal Historical Society's Whitfield Prize for 1992)
- Updated version of Kingsford's edition of The Stonor Letters and Papers 1290–1483 (1996)
- The Wars of the Roses: Politics and the Constitution c. 1437–1509 (1997)
- The Armburgh Papers (1998), an edition of the largest collection of 15th-century gentry letters discovered since the 19th century
- Political Culture in Late Medieval Britain (2004), as co-editor with Linda Clark and author of the introduction
- A New Constitutional History of Late-Medieval England, 1215–1509 (Cambridge University Press, 2004)
- Wisdom and Chivalry: Chaucer's Knight's Tale and Medieval Political Theory (2008) by S. H. Rigby. Reviewer: Professor Christine Carpenter, University of Cambridge.

== Honours and awards ==
- Fellow of the Royal Historical Society (FRHistS), 1982
- Faculty of History representative for The Prince's Teaching Institute
- Royal Historical Society Whitfield Prize, 1992
- Associate editor, Oxford Dictionary of National Biography, 1994–2002
- James Ford Special Lecturer, University of Oxford, 1996
- Guest lecturer, Moscow State University, 2006
- Co-editor, Cambridge University Press Studies in Medieval Life and Thought
- Member, editorial board, The Fifteenth Century
- Member, Medieval Sources Advisory Panel, The National Archives
- Member, board of directors, Anglo-American Legal Tradition (AALT)
- Member, Arts and Humanities Research Council Review Panel
- British Academy/Leverhulme Trust senior research fellow, 2002–2003
- Arts and Humanities Research Council major research grants, 1999–2008
- Member, council of governors, Francis Holland Schools
- Professorial fellow, New Hall, 2005–2008

== See also ==
- Faculty of History, University of Cambridge

Academic offices
Preceded by Steven Gunn	Ford Lecturer; 2015–2016	Succeeded by Stefan Collini
