= K. B. McFarlane =

British historian (1903-1966)

Kenneth Bruce McFarlane, FBA (18 October 1903 – 16 July 1966) was one of the 20th century's most influential historians of late medieval England.

== Life ==
McFarlane was born on 18 October 1903, the only child of A. McFarlane, OBE. His father was a civil servant in the Admiralty and the young McFarlane's childhood was an unhappy one. This may have led to the deep melancholy that seemed to pervade much of his adult life. His family sent him to public school at Dulwich College as a day-boy. McFarlane did not particularly like the atmosphere of the public school. In 1922 he earned a scholarship to read history at Exeter College, Oxford. His tutor during these years was C. T. Atkinson. In 1924 he was awarded the Stanhope Prize for his essay on Cardinal Pole. Following the completion of his DPhil on the loans of Cardinal Beaufort to the English Crown (September 1927), McFarlane became a fellow of Magdalen College, where he remained for the rest of his life.

His most important contribution to the field was his revision of the understanding of late medieval feudal relationships, known as "bastard feudalism". The old consensus, promoted primarily by Bishop Stubbs, was that payment for service in feudal relationships had promoted greed and civil strife. McFarlane, however, pointed out the adhesive effect of such a system, and other forms of patronage, as a field of common interest for the Crown and the landed aristocracy. According to Christine Carpenter in Wars of the Roses – Politics and the constitution in England c. 1473–1509 (Cambridge University Press 1997): "It is hard to exaggerate the impact of McFarlane's work, especially at Oxford where he taught. A whole generation of students there was inspired to work on what had been a very neglected century; nearly all the political historians of fourteenth and fifteenth century England today, including the present writer, are, academically speaking, the children or grandchildren, even great grandchildren, of McFarlane." She also described him as being responsible for a "paradigm shift". In more recent debate, it has been pointed out that McFarlane created a "paradoxical metaphor – the image of a polluted, dirty, as it were contaminated phenomenon – of the feudalism" which led to follow-up terms as it was a late-medieval "bastard urbanism" (a term invented by 19th-century historians to characterize feudalism as it took form in the Late Middle Ages, foremost in England).

In July 1966, while house-hunting before retirement, McFarlane was "ambushed by a stroke which killed him instantly". McFarlane never married.

== Publications ==
Although his scholarship and methods have had great influence on later historians, McFarlane did not publish widely in his lifetime. A. N. Wilson said of McFarlane that "he knew more about the late Middle Ages than anyone alive, but could not translate any of his knowledge into books". The main sources for his scholarship are the book Lancastrian Kings and Lollard Knights, published in 1972, his Ford Lectures from 1953, published in 1980 as The Nobility of Later Medieval England, and the essays and shorter articles published by his student G. L. Harriss in 1981 under the title England in the Fifteenth Century. Much of his influence on historiography is the result of his DPhil students, who held posts in many British universities. In 1952 he had contributed John Wycliffe and the Beginnings of English Non-conformity to the "Teach Yourself History" series.

Letters to Friends, 1940–1966, edited by G. L. Harriss, contains a selection from the large collection of correspondence deposited with Magdalen College and published privately through the college in 1997. The great bulk of McFarlane's correspondence remains unpublished.

== Sources ==
- The McFarlane legacy: studies in late medieval politics and society, edited by R.H. Britnell and A.J. Pollard. (1995).
- 'Kenneth Bruce McFarlane, 1903–1966' by K. J. Leyser. Proceedings of the British Academy, v. 62, 1976, pp. 485–506.
- 'A don of old school; Alan Bennett, recalls both the dedication and acerbity of his tutor the historian K B McFarlane', Oxford Today, v. 10 no. 2 (Hilary 1998), pp. 26–26.
- K.B. McFarlane, Letters to Friends, 1940–1966, ed. G.L. Harriss (Oxford: Magdalen College, 1997)
