= Pant-y-Goitre Bridge =

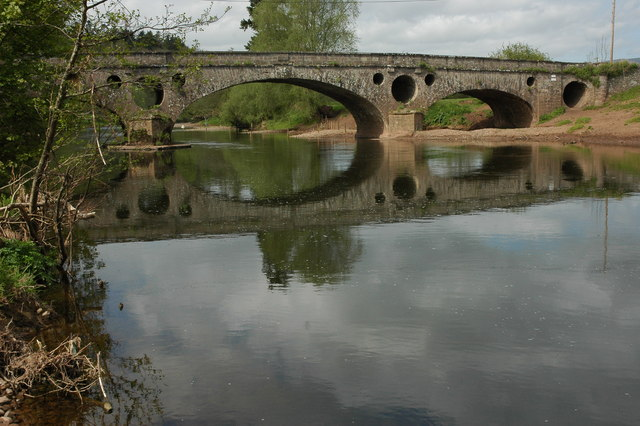
- "an unusual and handsome design"
- Coordinates: 51.7751°N 2.946°W
- Carries: road traffic
- Crosses: River Usk
- Locale: Llanvihangel Gobion, Monmouthshire, Wales

Characteristics
- No. of spans: 3
- Piers in water: 2

History
- Designer: John Upton (civil engineer)
- Construction start: 1821

Listed Building – Grade II*
- Official name: Pant-y-Goitre Bridge, with approach embankments and flood arches
- Designated: 9 December 2005
- Reference no.: 87210

Pant-y-Goitre Bridge crosses the River Usk between Abergavenny and Usk near the village of Llanfair Kilgeddin. The bridge carries the B4598. It was constructed in 1821 by the engineer John Upton.

== History ==
The bridge was designed and built in 1821 by John Upton as part of the improvements to the Abergavenny to Usk turnpike road. Upton also undertook other work in the immediate vicinity, including the Llanellen Bridge and churches at Llanvihangel Gobion and Llangattock-juxta-Usk.

== Description ==
The bridge is constructed of ashlar, and has three spans, with spandrel circular voids. The architectural historian John Newman describes the bridge as, "an unusual and handsome design". The bridge is a Grade II* listed structure.
