= St Michael's Church, Llanvihangel Gobion =

Coordinates: 51.7779°N 2.9492°W

St Michael's Church, Llanvihangel Gobion, Monmouthshire
- Church of St Michael and All Angels
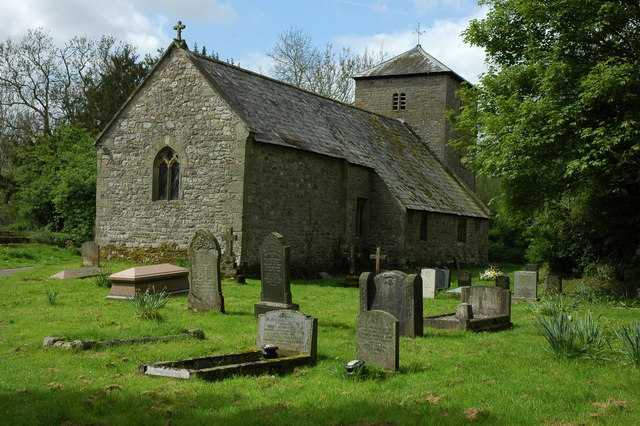
- "a medieval church, largely unrestored"

- Location in Monmouthshire
- Location: Llanvihangel Gobion, Monmouthshire
- Country: Wales
- Denomination: Church in Wales

History
- Status: Parish church
- Founded: C15th century

Architecture
- Functional status: Closed
- Heritage designation: Grade II*
- Designated: 9 January 1956
- Architectural type: Church
- Style: Perpendicular

Administration
- Diocese: Monmouth
- Archdeaconry: Monmouth
- Deanery: Raglan/Usk
- Parish: Heart of Monmouthshire Ministry Area

Clergy
- Rector: The Reverend Kevin Hasler

The Church of St Michael, Llanvihangel Gobion, Monmouthshire is a parish church with datable origins to the 15th century. There is no record of a Victorian restoration, although one must have occurred (the weathervane bears the date 1846), but there is documented evidence of a "light" reconstruction in 1925. Since the date, the church has barely been altered. It now is closed, having been declared redundant and is in the care of the Representative Body of the Church in Wales. It is a Grade II* listed building.

== History ==
The datable elements of the church are from the 15th century, although its origins may be earlier, it sits in a circular churchyard and an earlier sculpture has been incorporated into its South wall near the tower. The similarities of the roof-line and tower with those at St Cadoc's Church, Llangattock-juxta-Usk may suggest the involvement of the Gloucestershire engineer John Upton in a Victorian rebuilding, although there is no documented evidence of this. Upton also undertook work at the nearby Pant-y-Goitre Bridge. The architectural historian John Newman writes that the church was "lightly restored in 1925". St Michael’s is now closed. It remains a Grade II* listed building.

== Architecture and description ==
The church is constructed of Old Red Sandstone rubble. The most notable interior features are the "timber aisle-posts, polyganol and moulded", Cadw recording the "good internal carpentry including unusual timber arcade". Of particular interest is a crudely carved stone depicting two angels holding what appears to be a shroud below that of another, headless, figure which may represent the resurrected Christ. This is possibly from a chapel or other religious establishment which originally stood here. Also of note is the impressively large base of a 14th-century preaching cross opposite the South porch.
