= List of pubs named Carpenters Arms =

Signage for the Carpenters Arms Dental Practice, Dunstable, Bedfordshire, housed in the premises of a former public house

Stone plaque commemorating the site of the former Carpenters Arms at Henley Bridge (Remenham)

Pubs named (or once named) Carpenter Arms, include the following:

== Bedfordshire ==
- A former pub in Dunstable. The premises now house a dental practice.
- A pub in the village of Harlington.

== Berkshire ==
- A pub in the village of Burghclere which is owned by Arkell's Brewery.
- A former pub in Reading located on the corner of Orts Road and Arthur Road, which was closed and demolished c.1975 as part of the Newtown area redevelopment.
- A former pub in Remenham, on the Berkshire side of the River Thames next to Henley Bridge. The pub was demolished in 1984 and the headquarters of Henley Royal Regatta built on the site. A plaque and foundation stone remain in its place.
- A pub and French restaurant located in Sunninghill near Ascot.
- A pub in Windsor owned by the Nicholson's chain. The pub was built in 1518 and has passages from its cellars that ran to the nearby Windsor Castle but have since been bricked up.

== Bristol ==
- A former pub in Charlton, a small hamlet near Bristol. After World War II, the pub and most of the village was demolished for an extension of the main runway at Filton Airfield, now Filton Aerodrome.
- At least ten former pubs in the city of Bristol.
- "Carpenters Arms" Pensford, Bristol, BS39

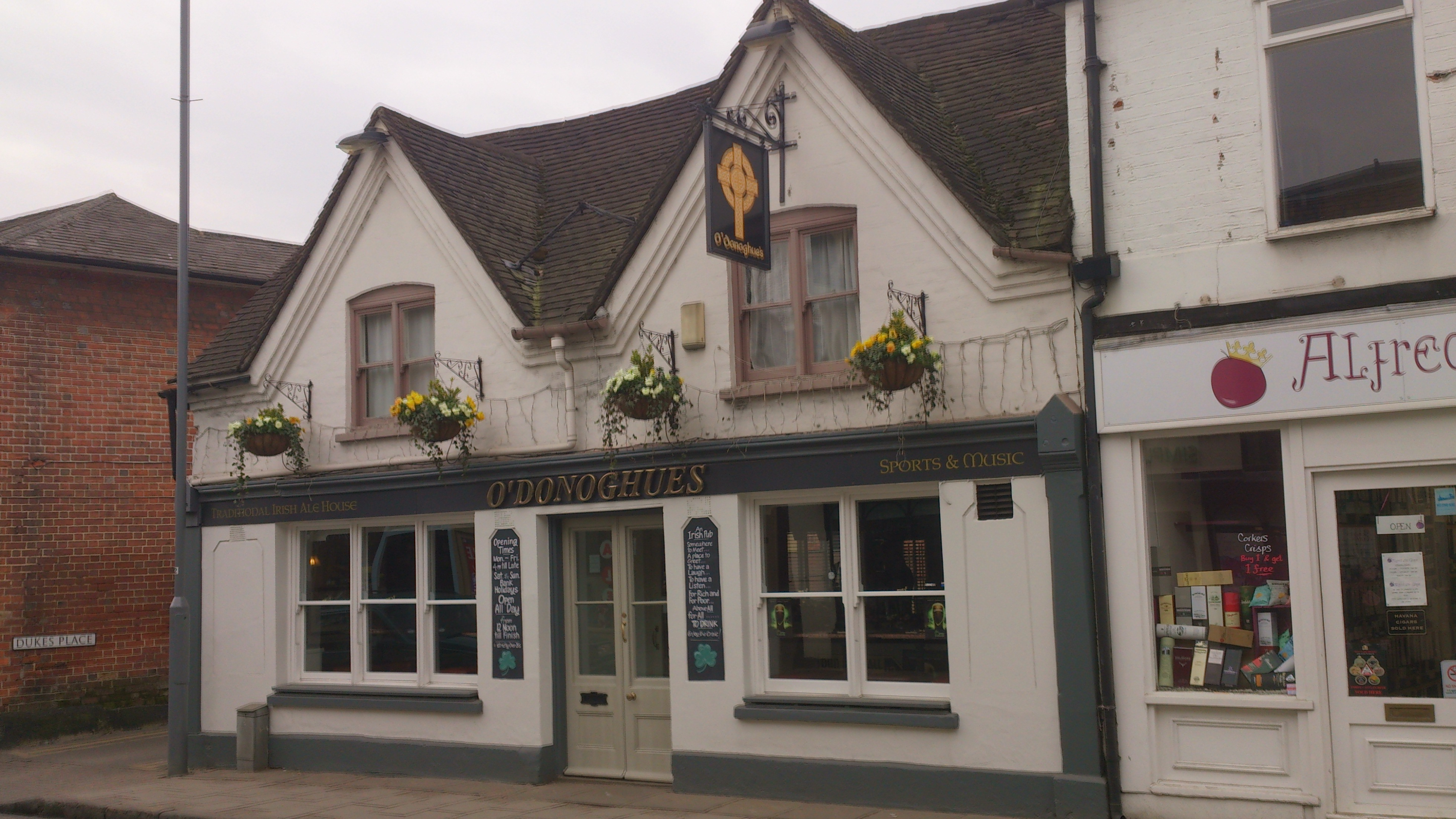
O'Donoghue's Irish Bar, Spittal Street, Marlow, formerly The Carpenters Arms. In 2017, the pub was renamed The Butcher's Tap.

== Buckinghamshire ==
- A former public house in the village of Chalfont St Peter. Located on the High Street, it has since been demolished.
- A pub in the town of Marlow which is a Grade II listed building from the early 1600s. This Carpenters Arms pub issued a 15mm copper farthing trade token that had the Carpenters Arms Coat of Arms of the Worshipful Company of Carpenters on one side. These quarter of a penny tokens along with a half penny trade token were produced from about 1648 to at least 1673. These trade tokens should not be confused with the 15.6mm copper trade tokens issued by George Carpenter, of Wapping, in the 1650s. In 2009, the pub was rebranded as an Irish bar and renamed O'Donoghue's. In 2017, it was confirmed that chef Tom Kerridge had purchased the pub which was renamed The Butcher's Tap.
- A former public house in the hamlet of Saunderton Lee, near Princes Risborough, which is now a private residence.
- A public house in the village of Slapton. It is a half-timbered construction begun in the 16th century under a thatched roof.
- A pub in the village of Stewkley, which also doubles as an Indian restaurant.

== Cambridgeshire ==
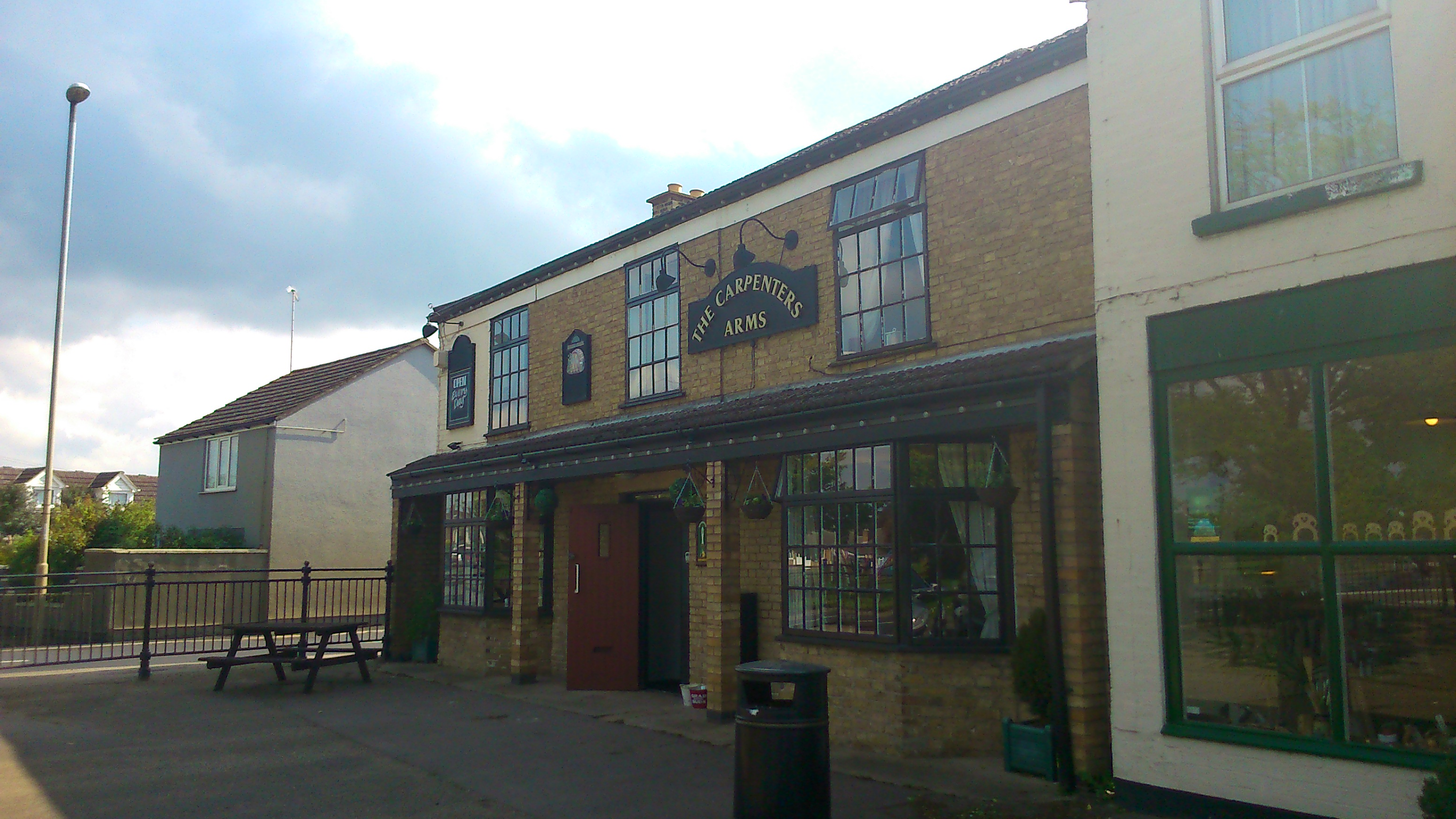
The Carpenters Arms, Coates

- A pub located in Victoria Road, Arbury, Cambridge, owned by Punch Taverns which closed in 2011, but re-opened in 2013 as a gastropub.
- A former pub on King Street in the city of Cambridge, which closed in the early 1900s. The street is noted for a pub crawl named "The King Street Run", although this pub had long closed before the crawl was devised.
- A pub in the village of Coates.
- A gastropub in the village of Great Wilbraham. The building is Grade II listed, dating back to the 1640s and has been a pub since 1729.
- A pub in the town of Soham on Brook Street.
- A pub in Stanground, a residential area of the city of Peterborough, located on South Street.
- A former pub in the village of Tydd St Giles, near Wisbech, which was situated on Buttersmith Alley.
- A former public house in Whittlesey which is known historically as Whittlesea, about six miles (10 km) east of Peterborough. The pub, now a private dwelling was located on Station Road.
- A pub in the village of Wimblington, Cambridgeshire. The building was constructed in the early 17th century and was named the Carpenter Arms by 1724.
- "Carpenters' Arms", Wisbech. A pub that may have gave given its name to Carpenter's Arms Yard. The last reference to the pub itself was in the 19th century.

== Cardiff ==
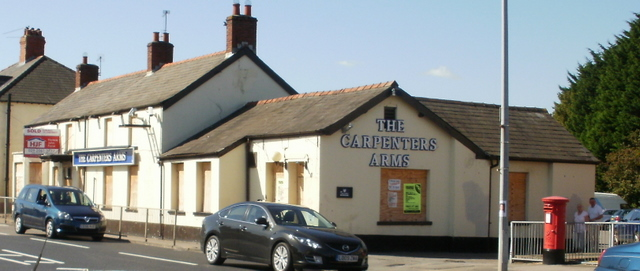
The former Carpenters Arms in Rumney, Cardiff

- A former public house in Newport Road, Rumney, Cardiff. Demolished to make way for a Sainsbury's Local store.

== Carmarthenshire ==
- A public house in Laugharne that now includes bed and breakfast.
- A 150-year-old public house cited at Llanhilleth.

== Ceredigion ==
- A pub and inn in Llechryd, a village approximately 3 miles (4.8 km) from Cardigan, in Ceredigion, Wales. The premises have been renamed Flambards and are now a hotel and tearoom.

== Cornwall ==
- A pub in the town of Metherell.

== Derbyshire ==
- A country pub in the village of Dale Abbey, near Derby and Ilkeston which is over 300 years old and has been in same family for more than 80 years.

== Devon ==
- A former pub in the town of Dawlish, now a private residence, on Old Town Street. The pub was originally tied to the Dawlish Brewery, who passed it onto the Heavitree Brewery in the 1920s.
- A pub in the parish of Ilsington situated on the eastern edge of Dartmoor.

== Dorset ==
- A new pub in Bransgore on the outskirts of the New Forest near Christchurch, Dorset.

== East Yorkshire ==
- A country pub in the village of Fangfoss on the edge of the Yorkshire Wolds.
- A former pub in Hull, on Great Union Street. First mentioned in 1806, it was known for a time as The Shipwrights Arms and was owned by the Hull Brewery when it closed in 1937. The building was bombed in 1941 and the current site is now occupied by a second-hand car lot.
- A pub in the town of Market Weighton.
- A former pub in Skirlaugh, which closed in 1968 and was located at the southern end of the village.

== Essex ==
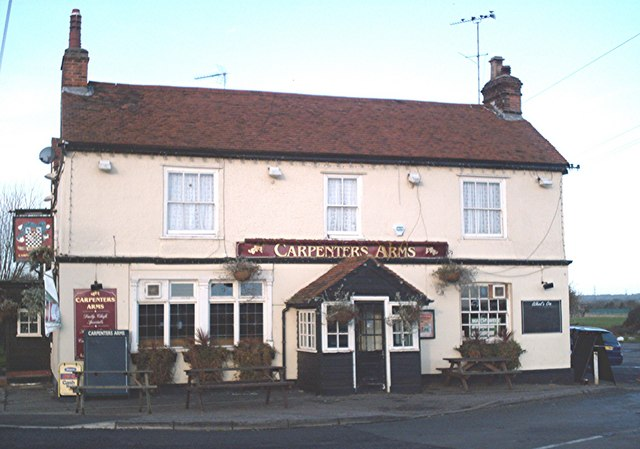
The Carpenters Arms in Rawreth

- A former pub on South Street (formerly Lower Railway Street) in the town of Braintree.
- A c18th pub for sale in the parish of Danbury.
- A pub located in Smarts Lane in the town and civil parish of Loughton in the Epping Forest district of Essex. The pub has two bars – the back bar a public bar and the front bar a saloon bar.
- A pub located in Gate Street, Maldon. The building has been in existence since the 1340s and was purchased by the Maldon Brewery in 1847, eventually becoming its brewery tap until the brewery's closure in 1952.
- A pub/restaurant in the village of Rawreth, near Wickford, currently known as The Carpenters Restaurant.

== Gibraltar ==
- The Gibraltar Methodist Church owns an alcohol-free cafe called The Carpenter Arms.

== Gloucestershire ==
- A public house in the market town of Dursley.
- A country pub in the village of Miserden.
- A pub in the village of Westrip in the District of Stroud.
- A public house in Wick, a village in South Gloucestershire between Bristol and Chippenham. The pub is located on Church Road.

== Hampshire ==
- A pub in the village of Burghclere on Harts Lane. It overlooks the woodland that inspired Richard Adams' book Watership Down.
- A former C18th pub in Ringwood.

== Herefordshire ==
- A village pub in Walterstone, near the Welsh border.

== Hertfordshire ==
- A former pub in Berkhamsted, located on Park Street which may also have been known as The Gardeners Arms.
- A pub in the town of Harpenden. The pub has its own cricket team, Carpenters Arms CC.
- The Rose & Crown in Flamstead was previously known as the Carpenters Arms.

== Kent ==
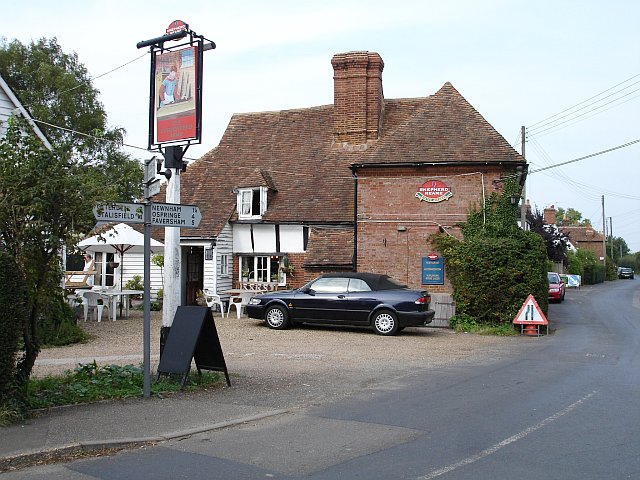
The Carpenters Arms at Eastling

- A former Whitbread pub in the village of Alkham, situated on Meggett Lane, which closed in 1969 and is now a private dwelling.
- A pub in the cathedral city of Canterbury near Westgate, located on Black Griffin Lane. This pub was formerly owned by Whitbread.
- A pub in the small village of Eastling, owned by the Shepherd Neame Brewery.
- A former C18th pub in Dover.
- A restaurant pub in Tonbridge that also provides accommodation.

== Lancashire ==
- A pub in Lancaster dating back to the 18th century. Noted for being one of a handful of pubs with an upstairs gravity fed cellar. It changed its name to The Three Mariners' in 1986.

== Lincolnshire ==
- A pub in Fenton, a village of West Lindsey.
- A C18th former public house in Pinchbeck. Landlord Richard Bunning.
- A former public house in Stamford. Located in St Leonard's Street, it became a private house and is now used as a bed and breakfast establishment.

== London ==
- A pub in Carpenters Road, Stratford, London, on the edge of the Queen Elizabeth Olympic Park. Particularly popular with West Ham United supporters on match days at the London Stadium.

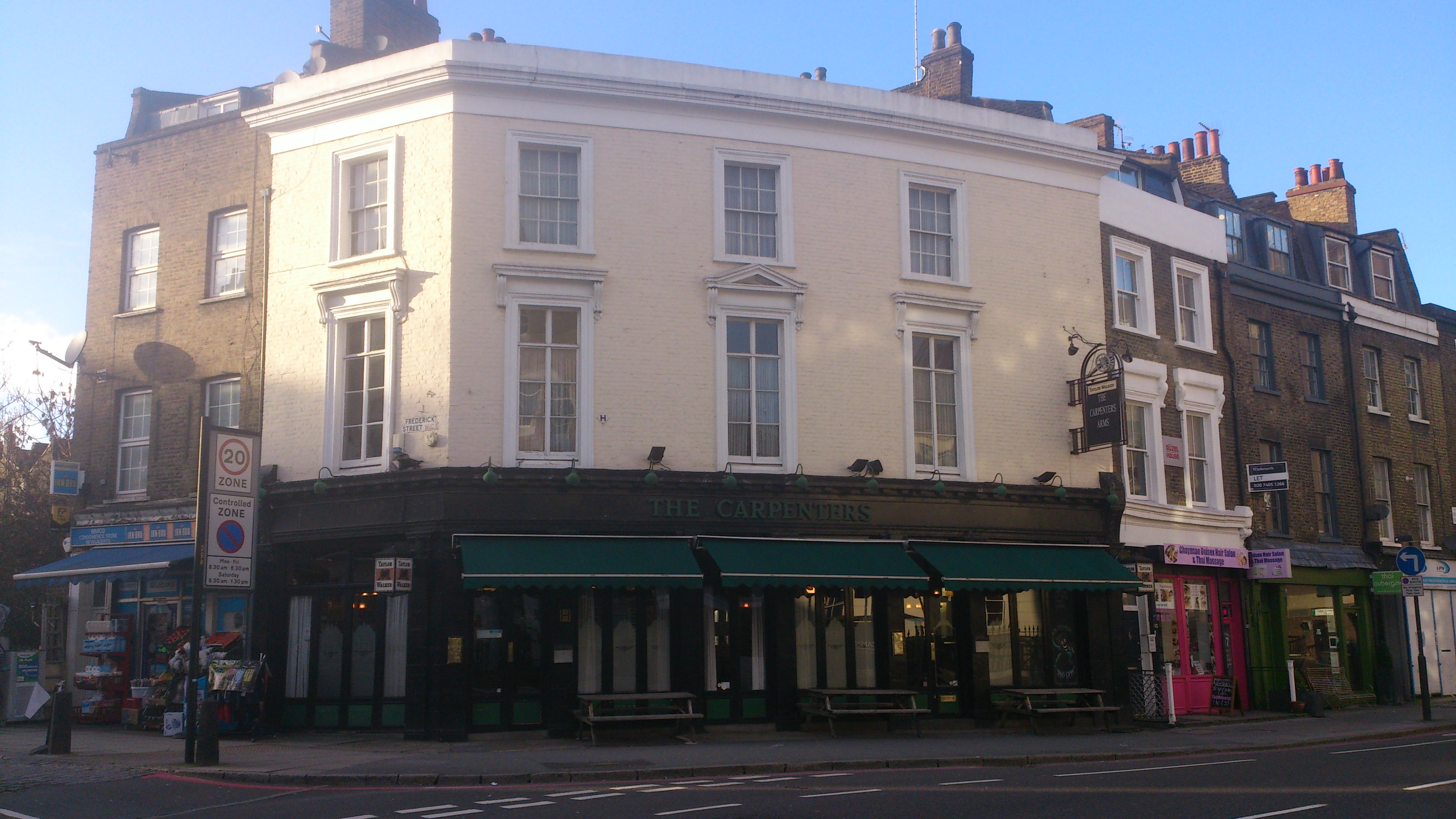
The Carpenters Arms, Kings Cross Road, Kings Cross

- A pub on Cheshire Street in east London which is a free house. It was once owned by the notorious Kray twins who bought it for their mother.
- A pub in Whitfield Street in the Fitzrovia neighbourhood of London near Tottenham Court Road.
- A gastropub in Hammersmith opened in 2007. Restaurant critic A. A. Gill gave the pub a five-star review in The Sunday Times.
- A pub on Kings Cross Road in the Kings Cross area of central London. In 2017, the pub re-opened as The Racketeer.
- A former pub in Elmira Street (prior to this, listed at Loampit Vale) in Lewisham. Opened in around 1855, the pub closed in 1956 and has since been demolished.
- Two former pubs in Limehouse, London, now both also demolished: one in Grenade Street and the latter on Ben Jonson Road. The latter, originally a beer house closed in c. 1999 and is now the site of a health centre. Was known as 'The Old Carpenters Arms' at the time of closure.

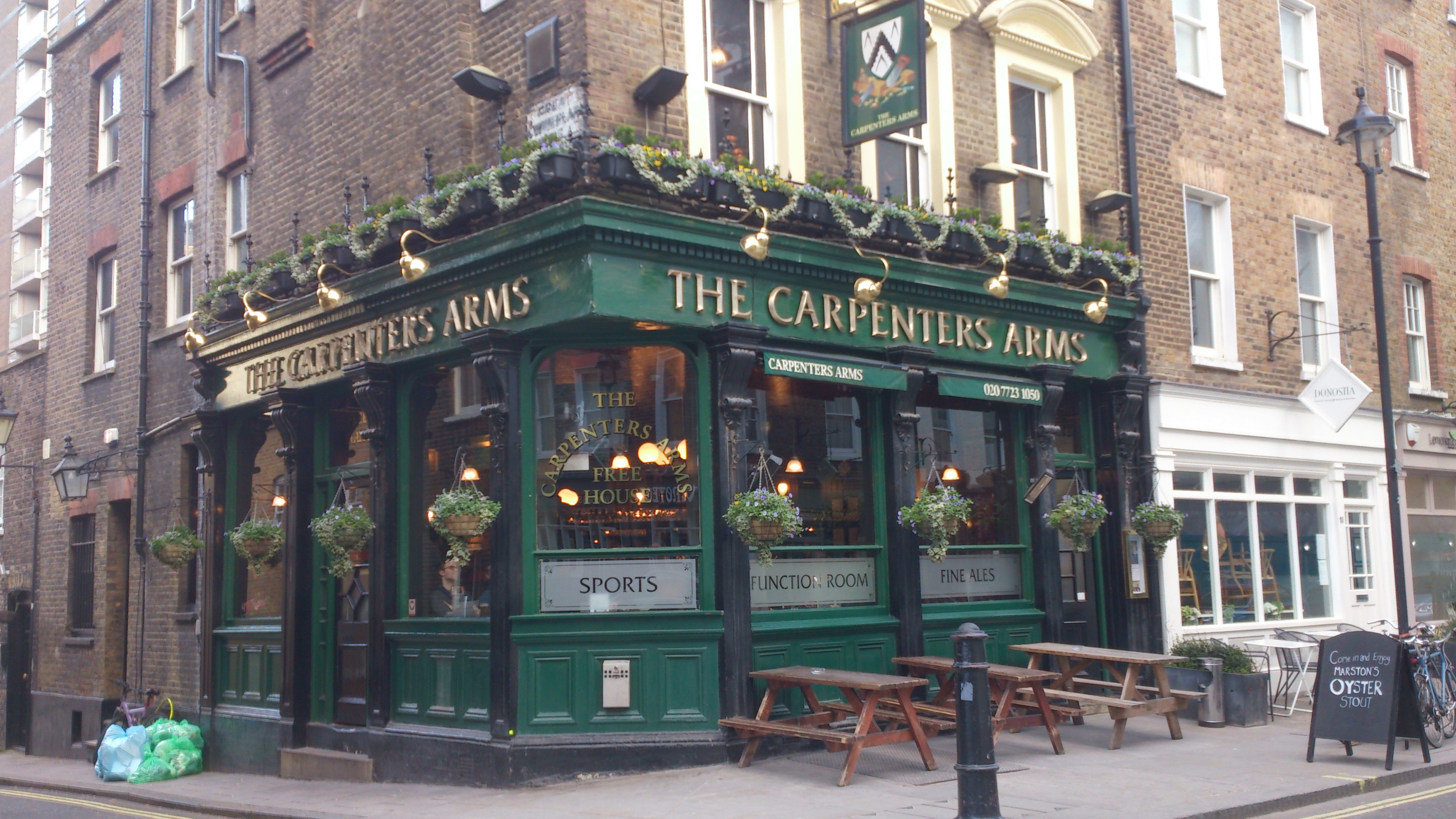
The Carpenters Arms, Seymour Place, near Marble Arch. This pub is a Free House.

- A pub in Seymour Place, off Edgware Road in London near Marble Arch. The pub has been in existence since 1776 and was rebuilt in 1872. The pub is a Free House and is also home to the London branch of CAMRA.
- A former pub on the corner of Bridport Place and Rushton Street next to Shoreditch Park. It is uncertain as to when the pub opened, however it was in operation in the 1850s. The pub, known as Rushtons at the time of closure, was converted to residential units circa 2002, however the building still retains its pub signage.
- A tavern in St. Marylebone, run by the parents of Edward Coxen in the mid-1850s to 1882. Originally situated at Gray Place, later becoming Picton Place, the pub changed name to the Three Cheers before closing in 2004 and becoming a Chinese restaurant. The current address is 29a James Street.
- A former pub on Cambridge Heath Road in the Stepney district of the East End.
- A former pub in Woolwich High Street, now demolished. The pub dated from the early 1800s and was rebuilt around 1925.

== Middlesex ==
- A pub in Hayes on Uxbridge Road, owned by Greene King.

== Monmouthshire ==
- A restaurant pub in Coed-y-Paen, near Pontypool.
- A 400-year-old pub in Llanishen, Monmouthshire a village between Chepstow and Monmouth in the Wye Valley
- A former pub in the village of Llanvihangel Gobion, now called the Charthouse Pub Restaurant, currently serving an Italian theme. In 1901 the then Carpenters Arms had Samuel Summers as the publican.
- A pub in the village of Shirenewton.

== Norfolk ==
- A pub in East Winch on the A47 road between Swaffham and King's Lynn. The road follows the route of the former railway line between the two.

== Northamptonshire ==
- A public house in Lower Boddington owned by the Hook Norton Brewery.

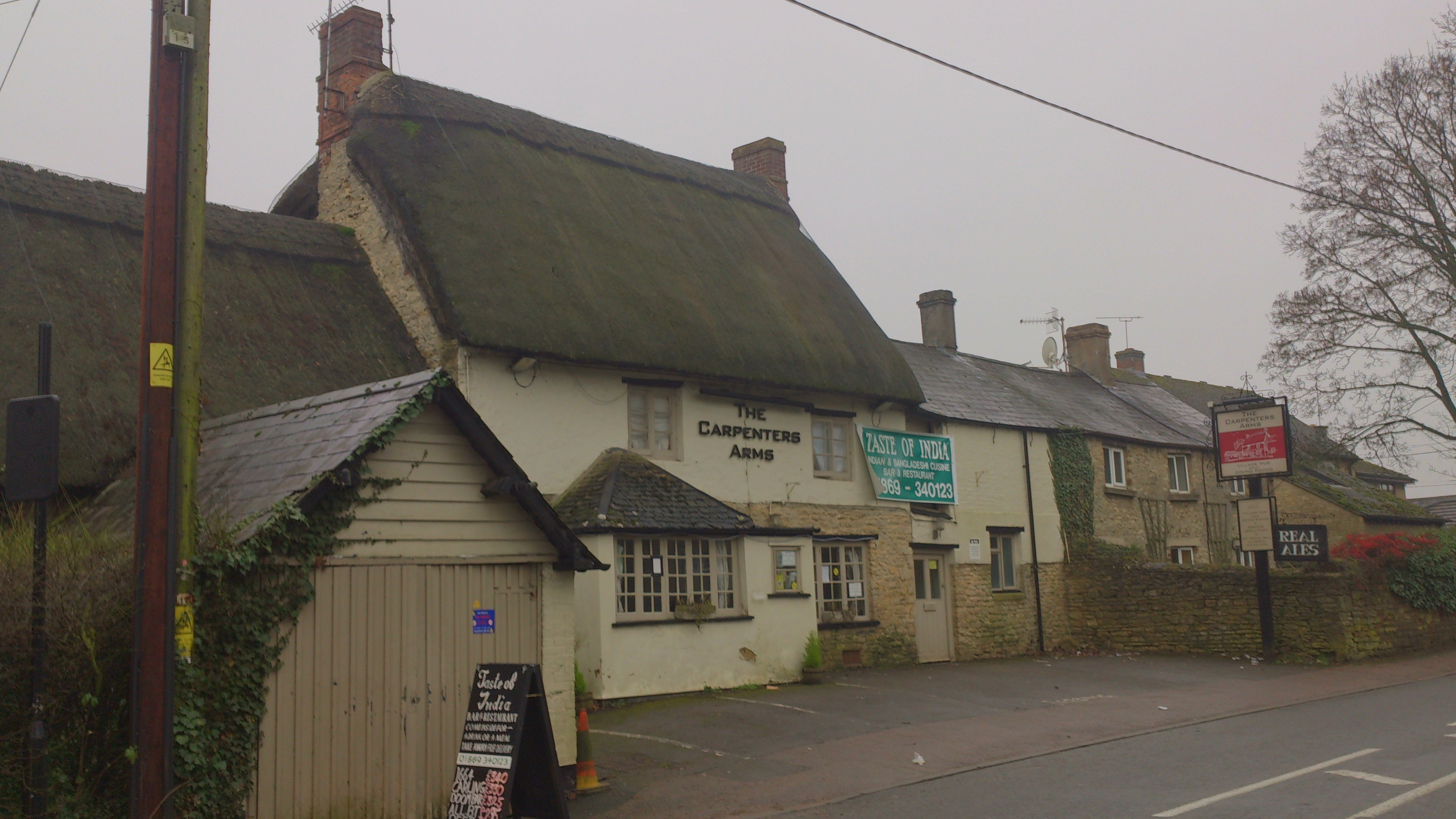
The Carpenters Arms in the village of Middle Barton, Oxfordshire

The former Carpenters Arms at Appleford, Oxfordshire

== North Lincolnshire ==
- A pub in Westwoodside where the Haxey Hood, a traditional annual event held every 6 January, is held between there and the village of Haxey.

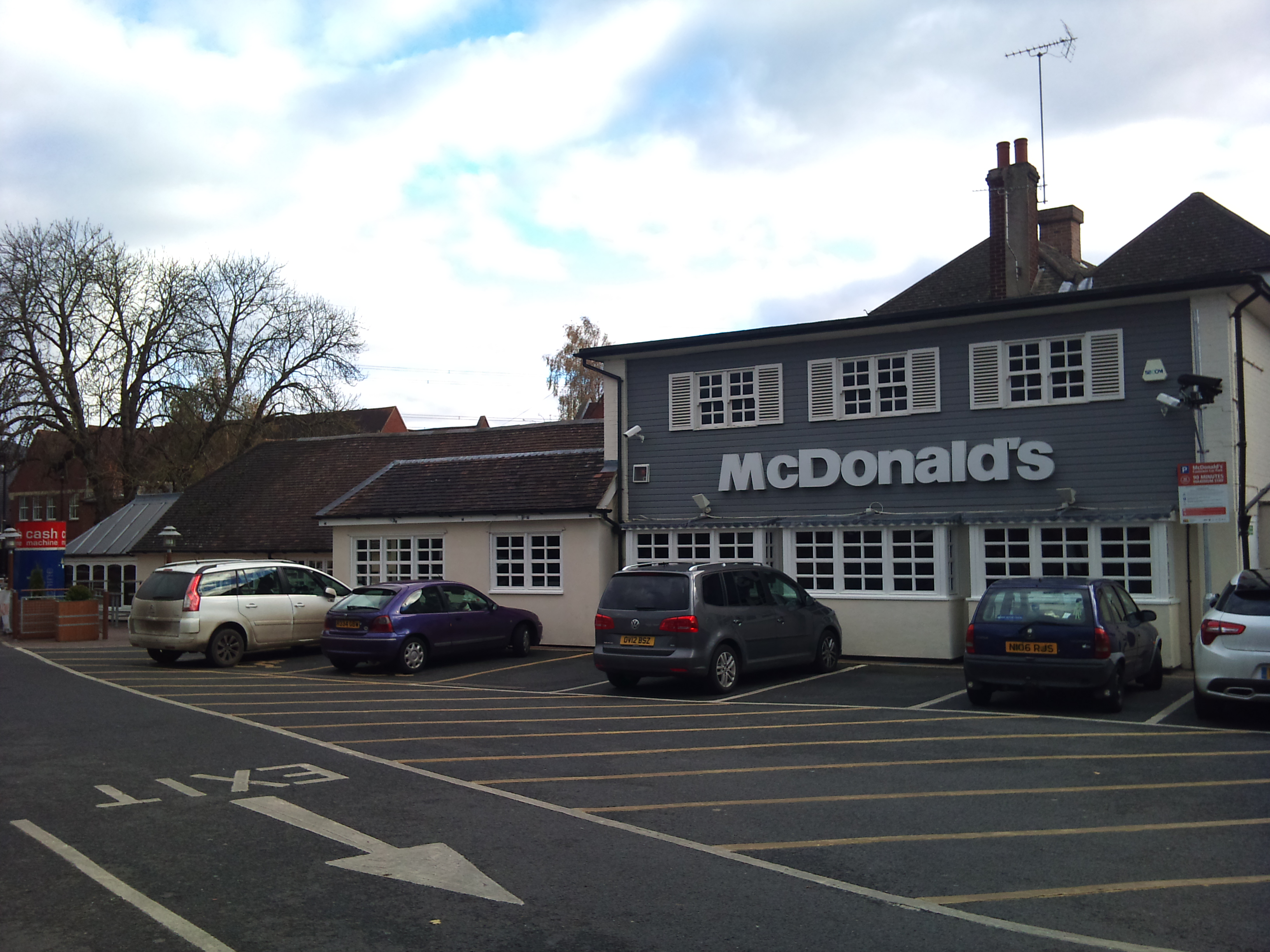
The former Carpenters Arms, Botley, Oxford, now converted into a McDonald's restaurant

== North Yorkshire ==
- A traditional village inn in the village of Felixkirk on the outskirts of Thirsk.

== Nottinghamshire ==
- A pub in the village of Walesby. Located on Boughton Road, it is owned by Everards Brewery.

== Oxfordshire ==
- A former pub in Appleford-on-Thames, a village which was part of Berkshire until the 1974 local government boundary changes. It was built in the 17th century and became a pub in 1891. The pub was renamed The Appleford Kitchen & Bar in 2011 under new owners, but closed in September 2012. It has now been converted into a private residence.
- A former tavern in Botley, which became a Beefeater restaurant and is now a McDonald's.
- A former inn in the village of Brize Norton. Situated on Station Road, it is a Grade II listed building which dates from the 18th Century which is now in use as a Bed and breakfast.
- A former pub on Hockmore Street, Cowley that closed in 1961 and was subsequently demolished to make way for the Cowley Centre redevelopment. The City of Oxford Silver Band rehearsed in a wooden hut in the pub's garden.
- A former pub in Crocker End, Nettlebed, south-east Oxfordshire, formerly owned by the Brakspear Brewery. Now a private dwelling.
- A former pub in Denchworth, near Wantage (a village that was also formerly part Berkshire until 1974), which was recorded in the 1851 census.
- A gastropub in Fulbrook, a village in West Oxfordshire near Burford. It dates from the mid-17th century and was named the Carpenter Arms in the early 18th century. This is claimed to be the location where "Tom, Dick and Harry" were from. They were supposedly three of a family of eight brothers (and all three highwaymen) from the area in the late 18th century.

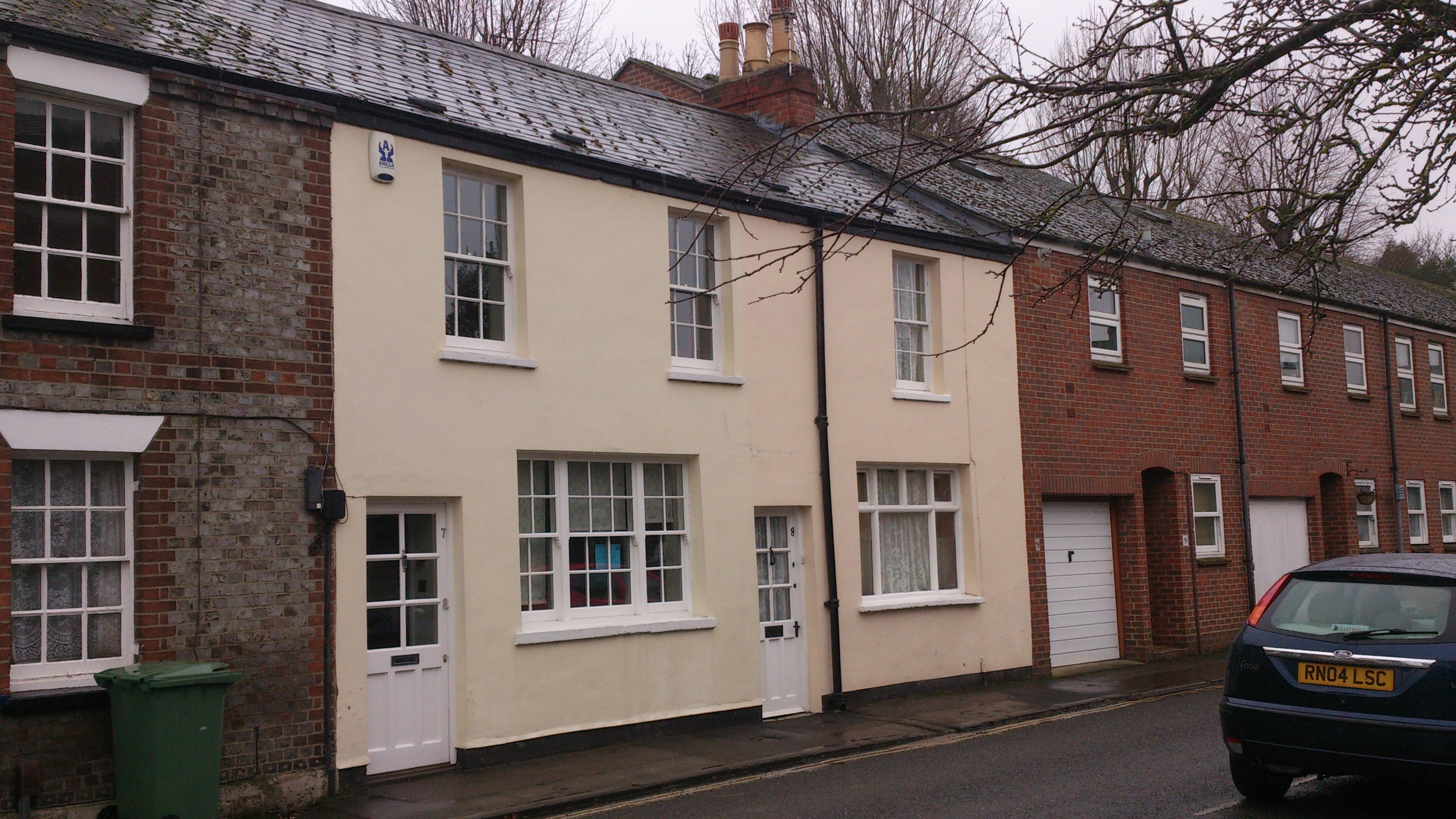
The former Carpenters Arms in Jericho, Oxford, now converted into two private dwellings

- A former pub in the village of Hailey, near Witney. Located on Middletown, the pub closed in the 1960s or 1970s and has since been converted to a private residence.
- A former Morrells brewery pub in the Jericho suburb of Oxford which closed in the 1990s and has since been converted into two houses.
- A pub in the village of Middle Barton. The building dates from the 17th-century and is grade II-listed. In 2017 the pub was converted to a Middle Eastern restaurant called The Cinnamon Stick.
- A former pub in Witney located on Newland (formerly Oxford Road). In 2019, it converted into a Cambodian restaurant but continues to operate as The Carpenters Arms.

== Somersetshire ==
- A pub and restaurant in the hamlet of Stanton Wick. Converted from mining cottages in the 19th century and now used as an inn.
- A pub and restaurant in Chilthorne Domer a village near Yeovil.

== Suffolk ==
- A pub in Great Bricett in the C18th. ADVERTISEMENTS. To be Lett. A very good Publick House, known by the Name of the Carpenters Arms in Great Briset, with a new Malting Office, and an Acre and half of Land, all Freehold.

== Surrey ==
The Carpenters Arms, High Street, Camberley, Surrey

- A town centre pub in Camberley.
- A pub in Limpsfield Chart, a village near to Oxted, owned by the Westerham Brewery.

== Warwickshire ==
The Carpenters Arms Public House in Kineton, Warwickshire

- A pub in Kineton, a large village in south-eastern Warwickshire. The tavern has a Chinese take-away inside and a restaurant.

== Wiltshire ==
- A mid 19th century English pub in Lacock on Church Street.
- A country pub in the village of South Marston near Swindon, owned by Arkells brewery.
- A pub in the village of Sherston. This pub closed in 2013.

== See also ==
- List of bars
- List of public house topics
- List of notable pubs in the UK
- The Carpenters Arms Motel in South Marston.
- The Carpenter Arms soccer club, a Trowbridge-based First Division Team.
- "Useyourlocal" search engine. It found 52 "Carpenter Arms " named places.

== Sources ==
- Townley, Simon, ed. (2004). A History of the County of Oxford. Victoria County History. Vol. 14: Bampton Hundred (Part Two). London: Oxford University Press for the Institute of Historical Research. pp. 225–234.
