= Carpenters Arms =

Common British pub name

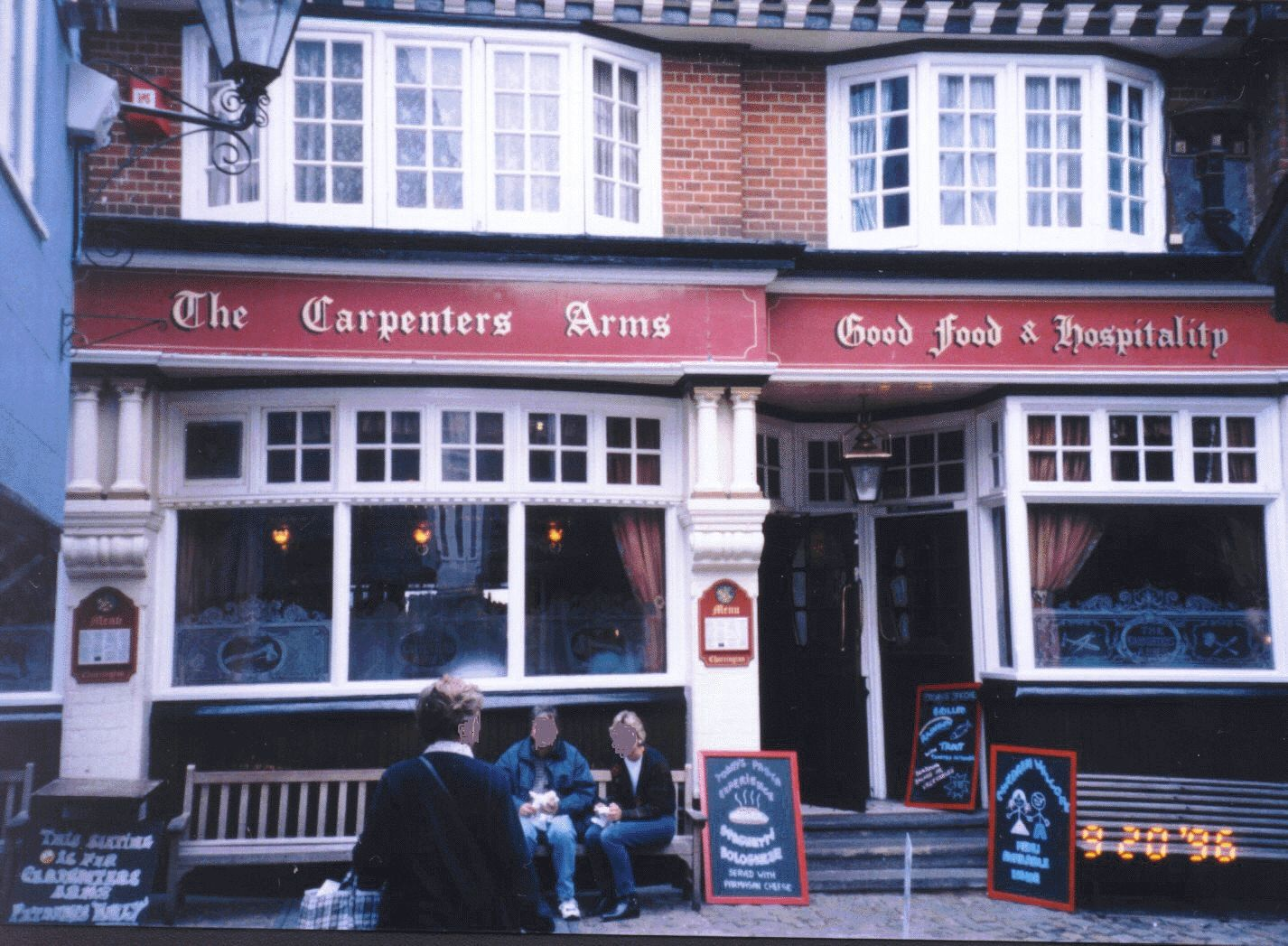
One of many Carpenters Arms pubs located in the United Kingdom. This one is in Windsor, Berkshire.

Carpenters Arms is a common British pub name.

The Carpenters Arms are today an unrelated series of public houses informally referred to as "Pubs" within the United Kingdom. Historically the first such named "Carpenter Arms" was based on a forfeit Carpenter Coat of Arms patent and supported by the Ale or beer producers circa 1721. The Alehouses helped create the "Public Houses" - the first true British Pubs in an effort to appeal to a wider audience and gain greater acceptance. Prior to this the pubs (not taverns) appealed to local tastes and often were the fronts of actual homes. These were rather ramshackled affairs appealing to occupational men.

The occupational crafts such as carpenters (once called wrights then woodwrights in England), bricklayers, stonemasons, masons, et cetera were intended to attract those local working men. During the Victorian architecture building of the Victorian Age of 1837-1901 many pubs were ungraded and added "Arms" to their names as a claim to higher status.

Over time, many "Carpenter Arms" were converted into other businesses and even private homes. Some establishments date from the 17th century and others reside in more modern buildings. Over 75 taverns, pubs and such have been identified as having or once having the name Carpenter Arms. See: List

== Name conflict ==
The historic named "Carpenter Arms" started to be used after a forfeit of title by Baron Carpenter in 1719. When the Carpenter Arms were re-patented, this caused a legal conflict with the Alehouse pubs called "Carpenter Arms." The English courts determined in a series of rulings from 1725 to 1734 that the business use in England of Carpenters Arms and similar Arms could continue, provided they did not display the full arms issued by patent such as the supporters, motto and crest. In addition, they could not claim patronage in any way to the Arms unless given by contract.

== Car cricket ==
The "Carpenter Arms" are on traditional lists of car cricket, also known as pub cricket, a car game played in the United Kingdom and other countries with a sufficient number of suitably named pubs.

== Drug Rehab ==
A rehabilitation centre for men and a registered English charity, on Wharncliffe Road, Loughborough in Leicestershire, is also called The Carpenter's Arms. The name is a dual reference to the hotel/pub context and the arms of The Carpenter. They also have a Carpenter Arms football (soccer) team.

== Football ==
Over various time periods some Carpenter Arms have supported football (soccer) teams by the same name. For example, A Trowbridge-based first division team was sponsored by the Swindon Carpenters Arms. This club folded in late 2014 after almost two decades of play.

== Trade tokens ==
The Worshipful Company of Carpenters Coat of Arms.

The former Carpenter Arms pub in the town of Marlow resided in a Grade II listed building from the early 17th century. It had a metal Carpenters Coat of Arms sign that has since disappeared.

This Carpenters Arms pub once issued a 15 mm cooper farthing trade token that had the Carpenters Arms Coat of Arms of the Worshipful Company of Carpenters on one side. These quarter of a penny tokens along with a half penny trade token were produced from about 1648 to at least 1673.

These trade tokens should not be confused with the 15.6 mm cooper trade tokens issued by George Carpenter, of Wapping, in the 1650s.

In 2009, this old Carpenters Arms pub was rebranded as an Irish bar and renamed O'Donoghue's.

== See also ==
- Pub names
- List of pubs named Carpenters Arms
