= Church of St Mary the Virgin, Llanfair Kilgeddin =

Coordinates: 51.7731°N 2.9350°W

Church of St Mary the Virgin
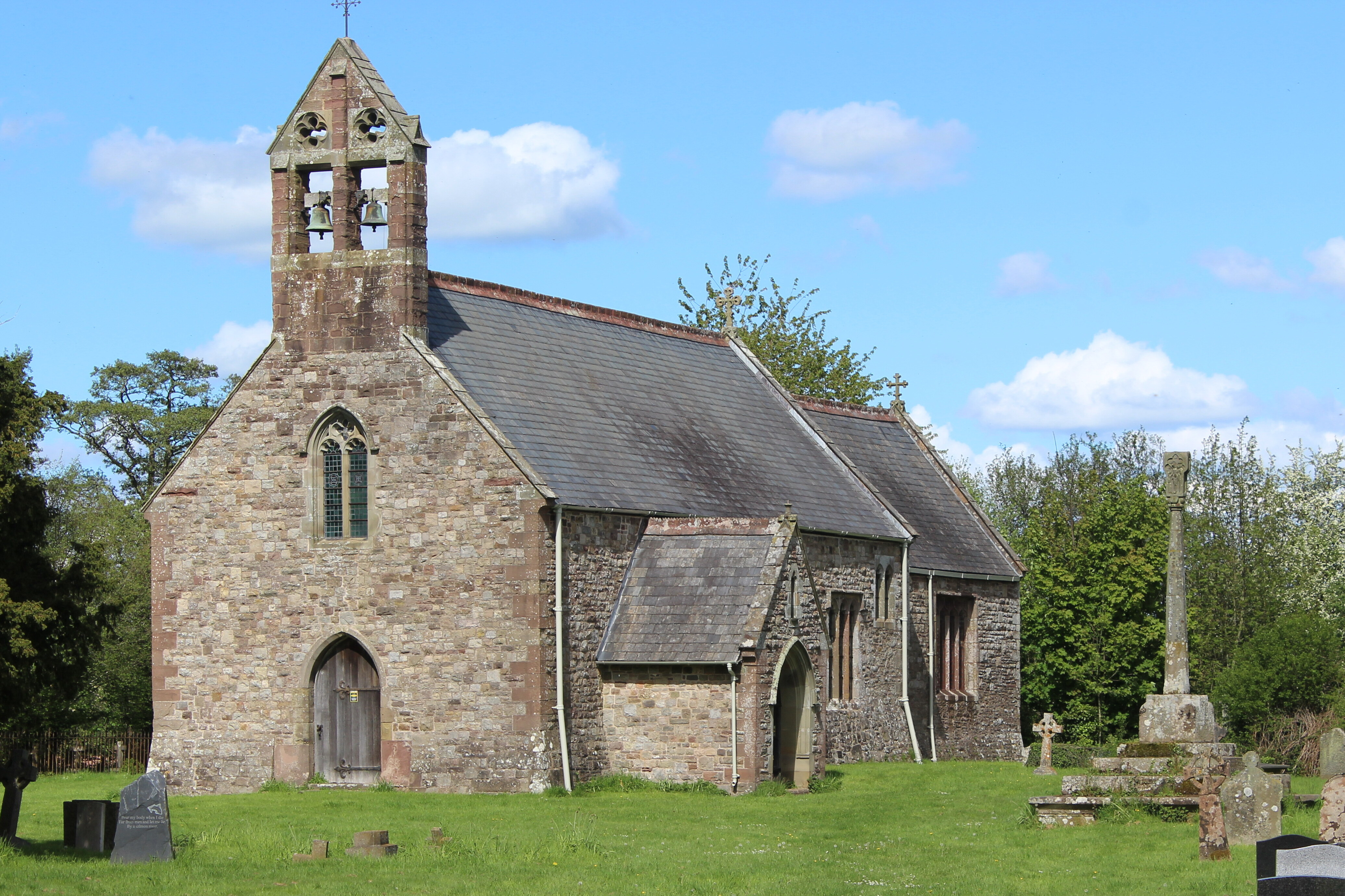
- Church of St Mary the Virgin
- Location: Monmouth, Monmouthshire
- Country: Wales
- Denomination: Church in Wales

History
- Status: Inactive

Architecture
- Heritage designation: Grade I listed building
- Designated: 9 January 1956
- Years built: late 13th/early 14th century
- Closed: 1989

Administration
- Diocese: Monmouth

St Mary the Virgin is the former parish church for Llanfair Kilgeddin, near Usk in Monmouthshire, south east Wales. It is a Grade I listed building, notable for its significant Arts and Crafts interior. The church was declared redundant in the 1980s and is now in the care of the Friends of Friendless Churches.

== History and architecture ==
The church is located on farmland close to the river, about 1 mile north of the village. It was originally medieval but was rebuilt in 1875–76 by the architect John Dando Sedding, commissioned by the local rector, Rev. William John Coussmaker Lindsay (1832–1912). The church contains some mediaeval features including a font, but is best known for its Arts and Crafts style sgraffito decorations which cover the interior walls. These were commissioned by Lindsay at a cost of £500 in memory of his wife Rosamund, and were designed by Heywood Sumner. Taking the Benedicite as his theme, Sumner used thin layers of different coloured plaster cut back to reveal colour underneath. His designs included local features, including the River Usk, the Sugar Loaf and nearby Llanvihangel Gobion church tower. Sumner's work was completed in 1888.

In the 1980s, the church was declared redundant and threatened with demolition. It was vested in the charity the Friends of Friendless Churches in 1989, and the charity has held the freehold since 22 November 1989. The charity was supported by the Victorian Society and received financial support from Cadw and the Pilgrim Trust. The graveyard contains a private burial ground dedicated to members of the family of Richard Crawshay, and his nephew, Crawshay Bailey, the ironmasters of the Cyfarthfa Ironworks who had a house nearby, Maindiff Court, Abergavenny. The wall paintings were restored in 2006–07 in memory of Roy Jenkins. The architectural historian John Newman wrote of Sumner's decoration; "it should make Llanfair Kilgeddin a place of pilgrimage for disciples of the Arts and Crafts movement". The Church of St Mary is a Grade I listed building.

== Gallery ==
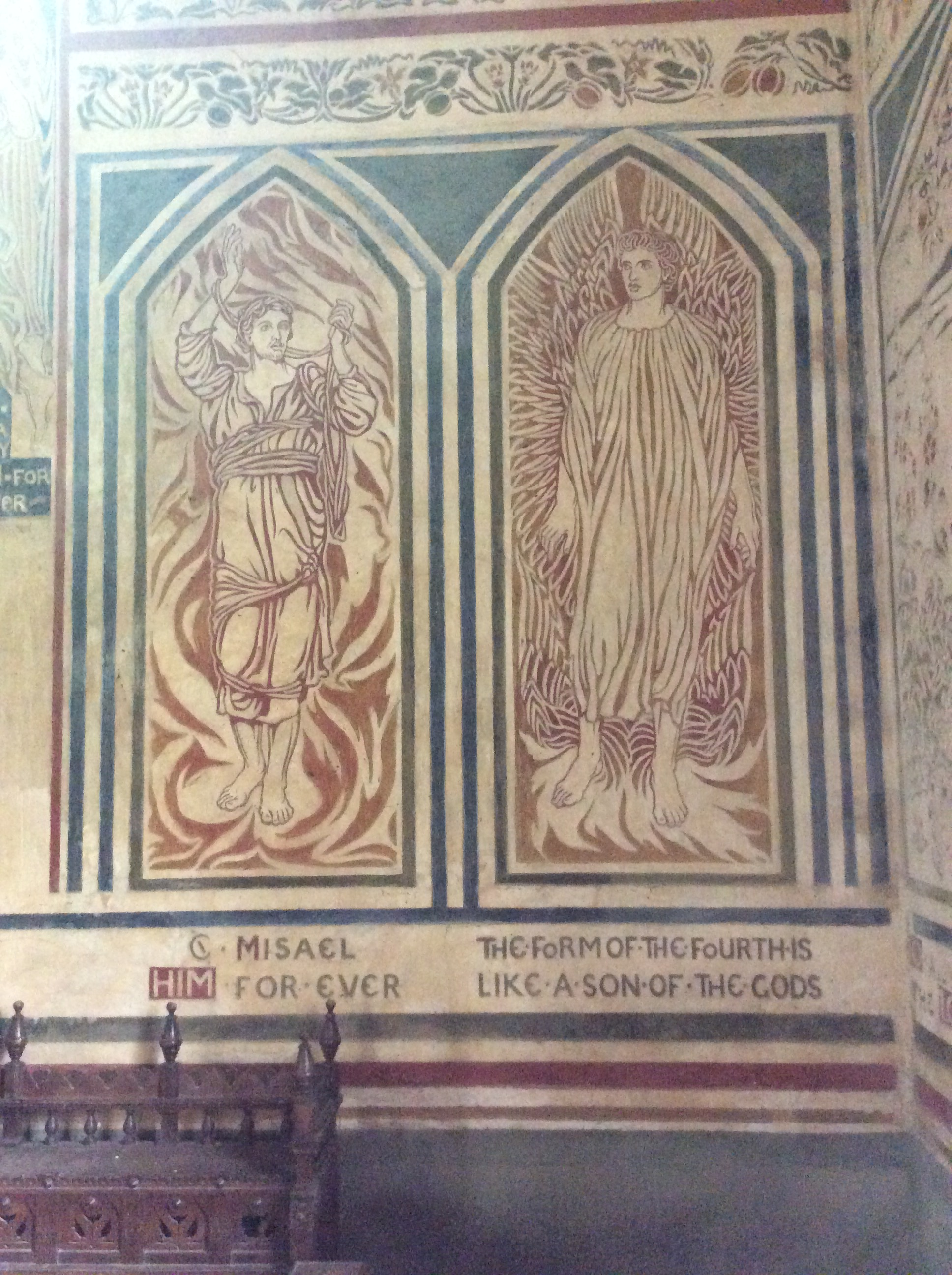

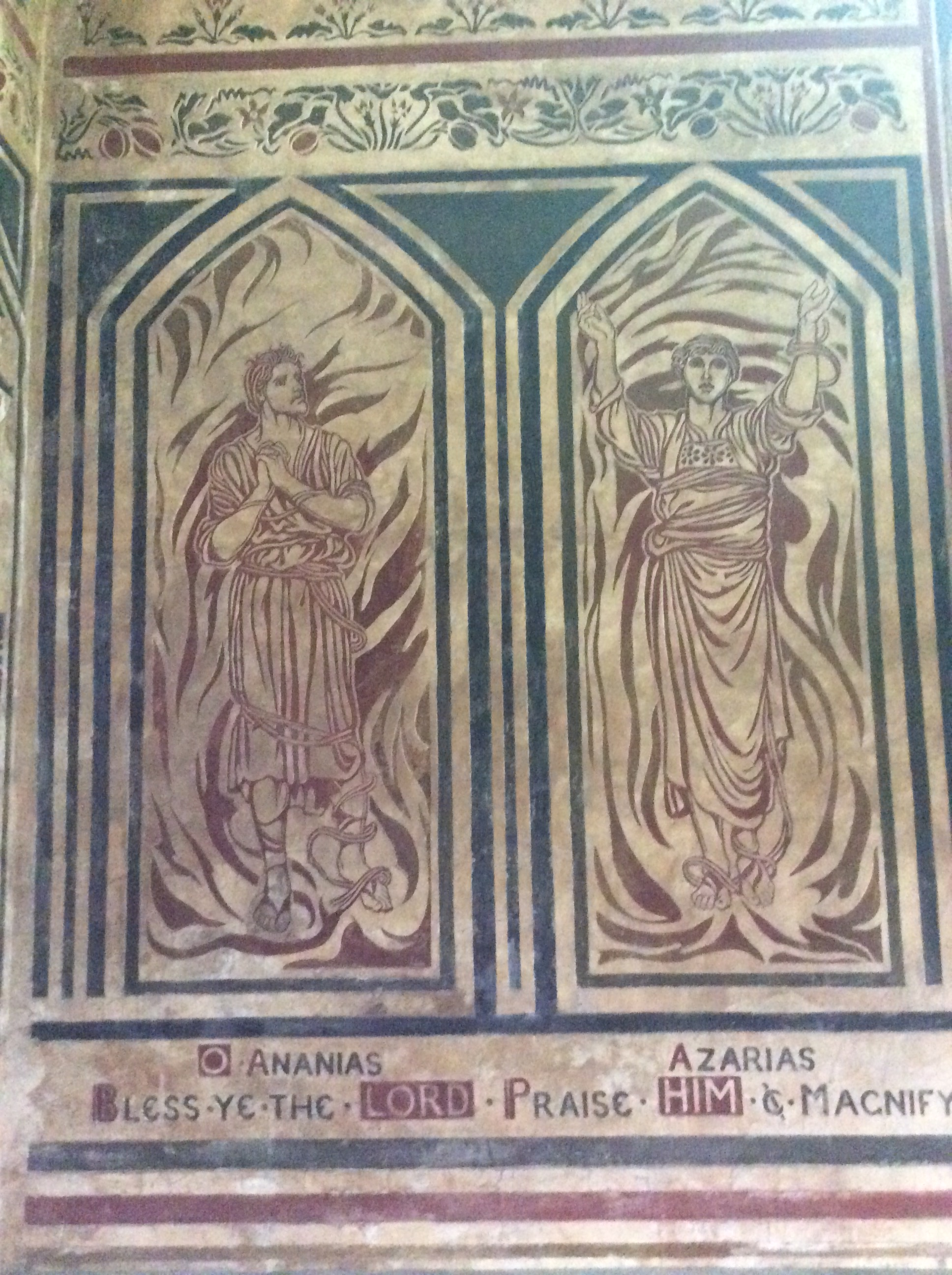

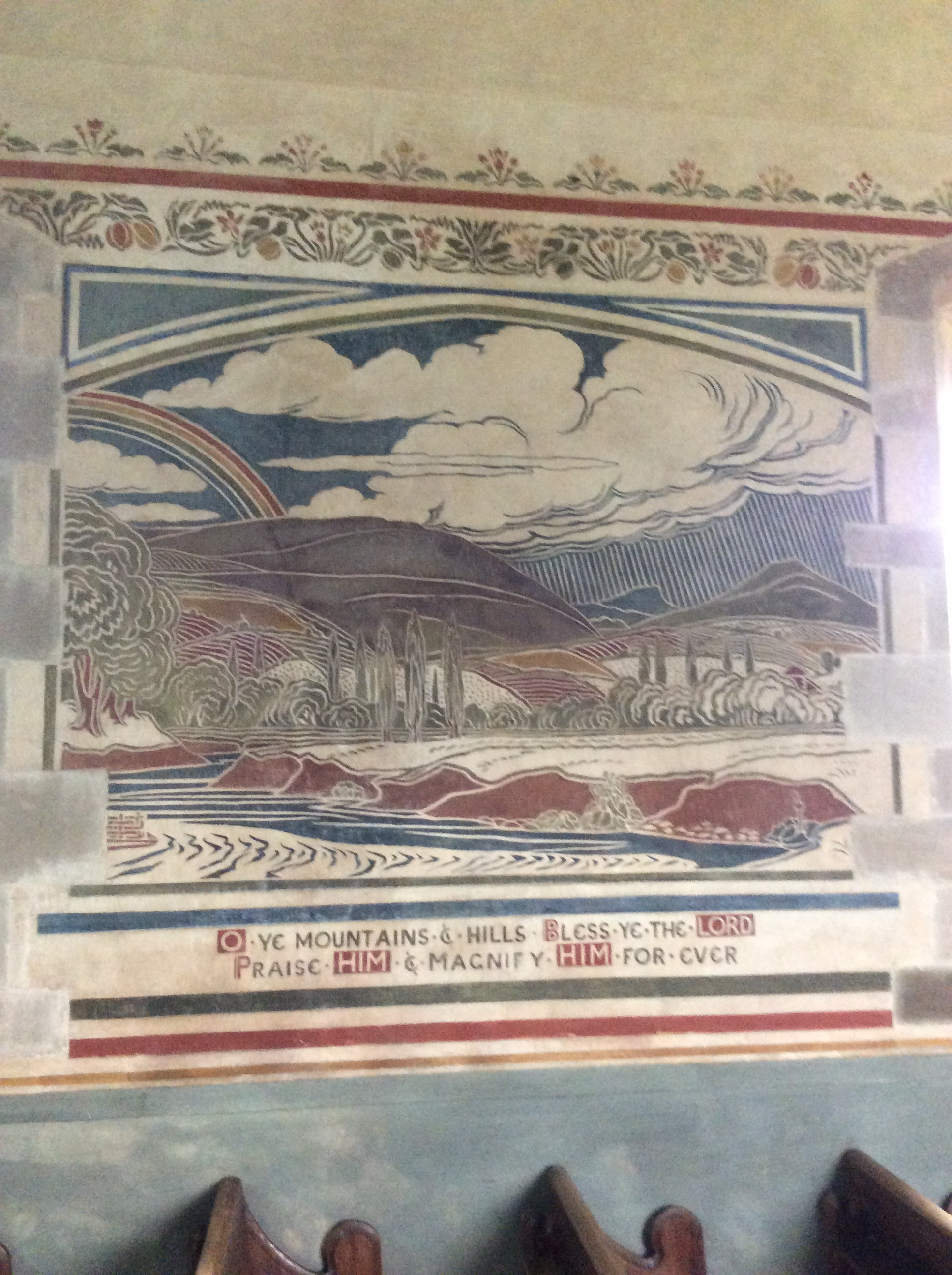

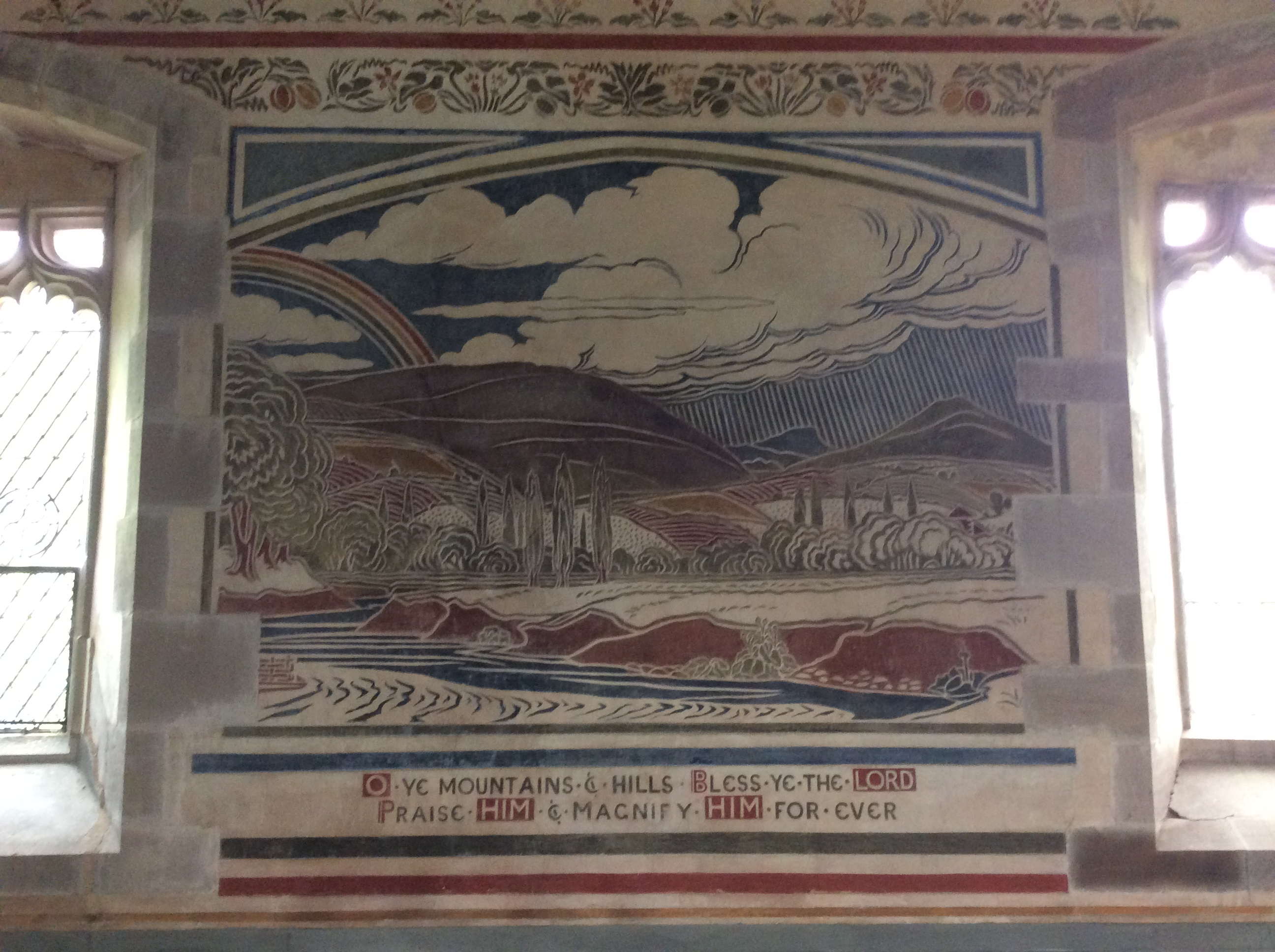

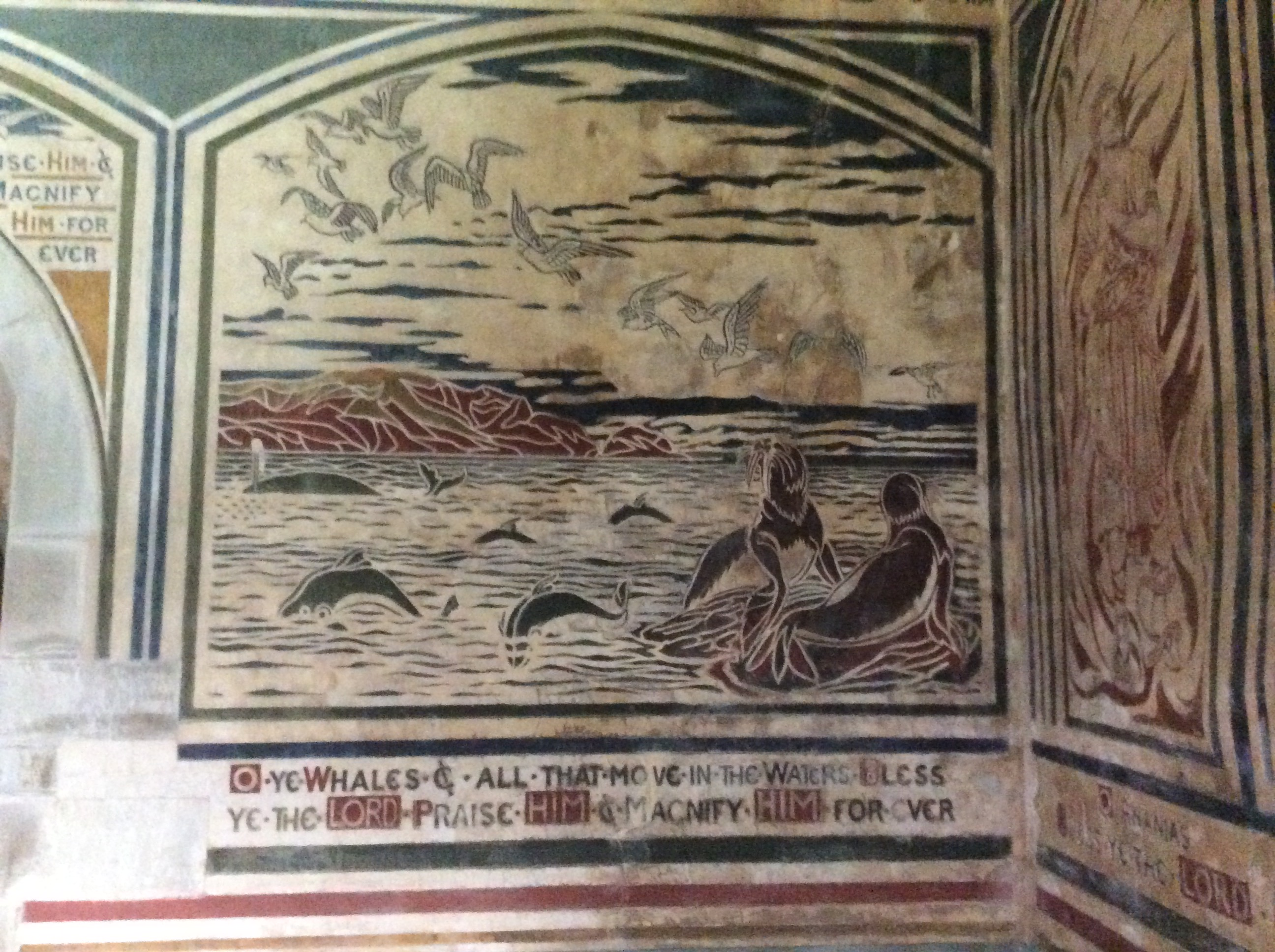

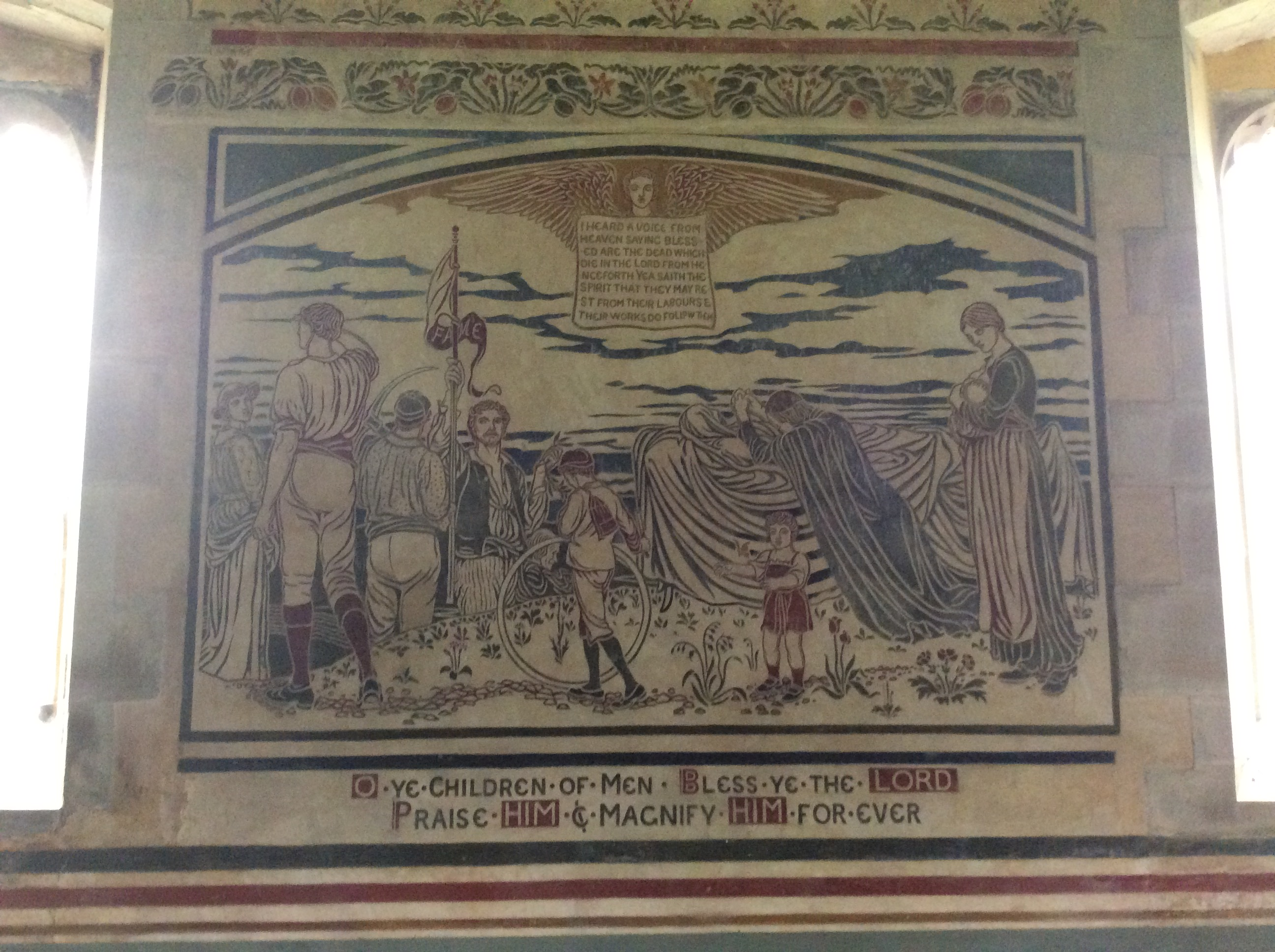

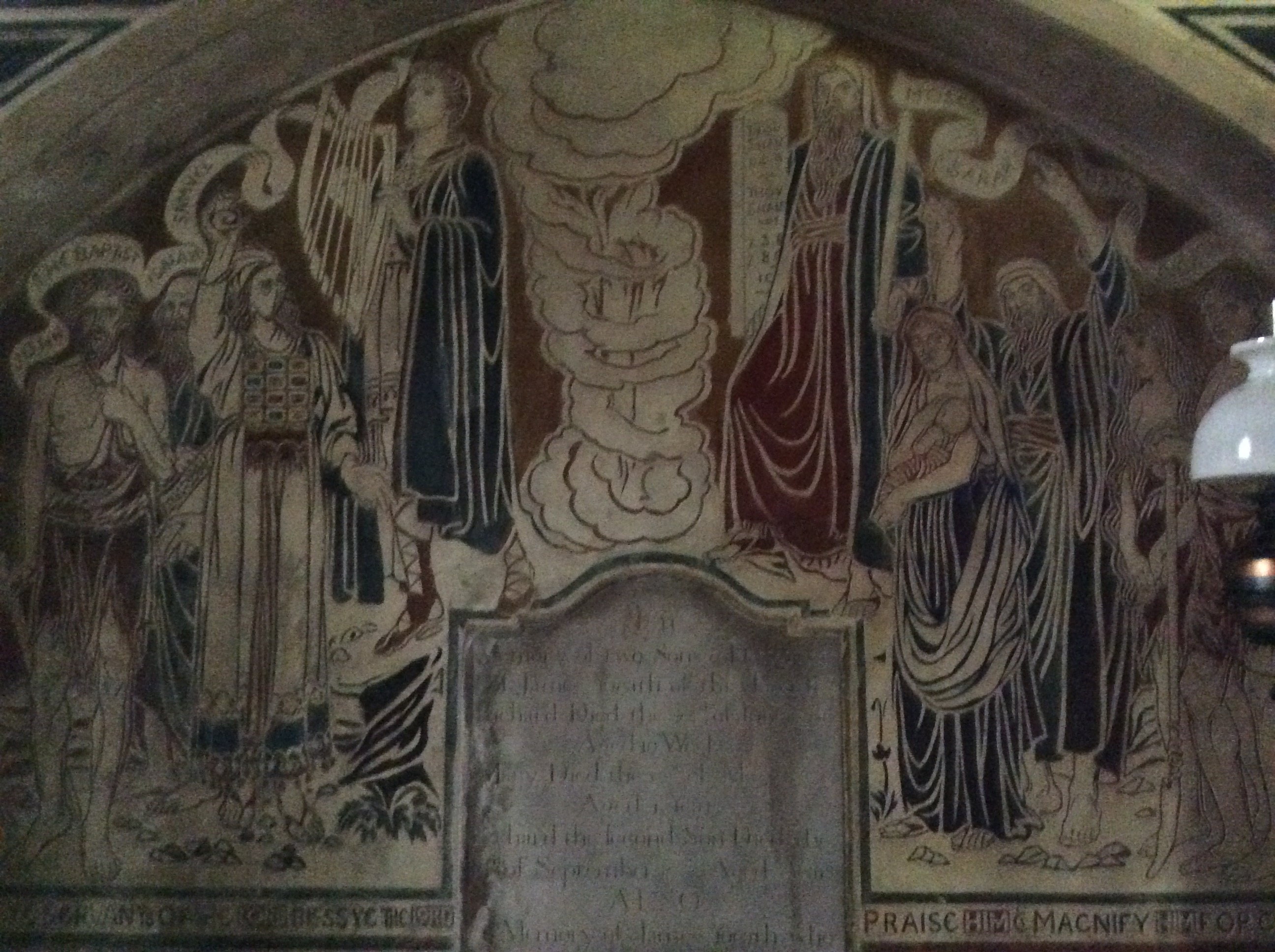

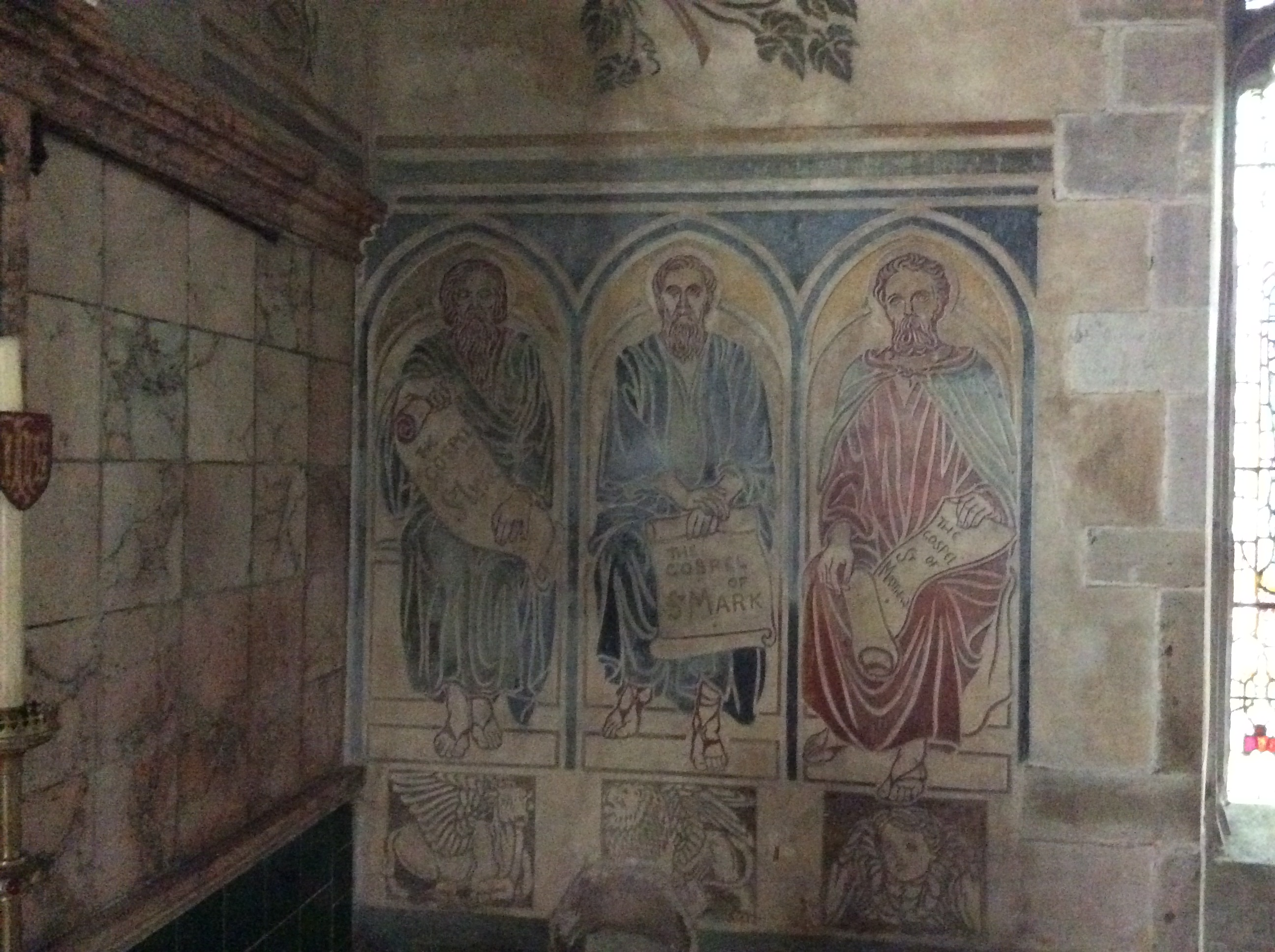

== Sources ==
- Jenkins, Simon (2008). Wales: Churches, Houses, Castles. London: Penguin. ISBN 978-0-713-99893-1.
- Newman, John (2000). Gwent/Monmouthshire. The Buildings of Wales. Penguin. ISBN 0-14-071053-1.
- Saunders, Matthew (2010). Saving Churches:Friends of Friendless Churches - the First 50 Years. London: Frances Lincoln. ISBN 9780711231542.
