= Llanvihangel Gobion =

Village in Monmouthshire, Wales

Coordinates: 51.77944°N 2.94793°W

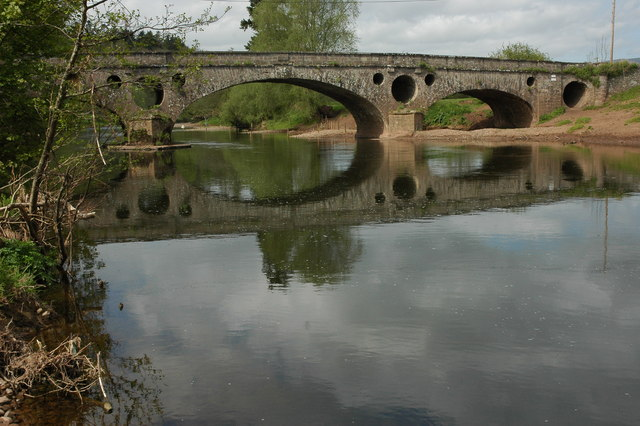
Pant-y-Goitre Bridge

Llanvihangel Gobion (Welsh: Llanfihangel-y-gofion) is a village and rural parish of Monmouthshire, Wales, lying within the administrative community of Llanover.

== Location ==
Llanvihangel Gobion is located approximately 5 miles east of Abergavenny not far from the A40 road and situated on the B4598 Abergavenny to Usk road.

== Amenities ==
The Llansantffraed Court Hotel is situated nearby, as well as the Charthouse Pub Restaurant, currently an Italian restaurant. The Charthouse was the Carpenters Arms around 1901 when Samuel Summers was the publican and the Herbert Arms around 1911 when William Williams was the publican. The village has a church, St Michael's.

=== Pant-y-Goitre Bridge ===
The location is very rural. The River Usk passes close by, crossed by the Grade II* listed structure Pant-y-Goitre Bridge.

The bridge was built around 1821 to carry the turnpike road between Abergavenny and Usk. It was designed and built by John Upton of Gloucester, who also built the nearby Llanellen Bridge.

There are three segmental arches of red sandstone ashlar masonry. The central arch is larger, one of the flanking arches is dry and forms a flood arch. Flooding is a problem on this river and the spandrels are pierced by three large circular tunnels. A further tunnel in the abutments gives additional flood protection and also acts as a cattle creep.

== Harry Llewellyn ==
Harry Llewellyn lived nearby at the time of his fame with Foxhunter.
