= The Bryn =

Village in Monmouthshire, Wales

Coordinates: 51.783°N 2.970°W

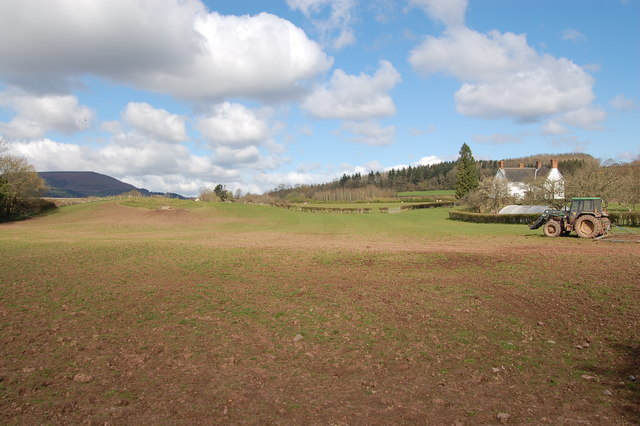
Pastureland at The Bryn, looking northwest across Rectory Farm. The Blorenge is to the left and the Abergavenny-Cwmbran railway embankment in the distance

The Bryn (also Llangattock-Juxta-Usk or Llangattock Nigh Usk) (Welsh: Llangatwg Dyffryn Wysg), is a small village on the left bank of the River Usk in Monmouthshire, southeast Wales. It is accessed by a cul-de-sac minor road from the B4598 road, the reclassified former trunk road between Raglan and Abergavenny, now replaced by the modern A40 dual carriageway which runs east–west immediately north of the village.

On the western edge of the village is St Cadoc's Church, a Gothic perpendicular style Grade II* listed building probably dating from the fifteenth century. The village falls within the administrative community of Llanover. The Usk Valley Walk passes along the riverside path to the south.
