= Listed buildings in Eastling =

Historic structures in Kent, England

Eastling is a village and civil parish in the Swale District of Kent, England. It contains 30 listed buildings that are recorded in the National Heritage List for England. Of these three are grade II* and 27 are grade II.

This list is based on the information retrieved online from Historic England.

== Key ==
Grade	Criteria
I	Buildings that are of exceptional interest
II*	Particularly important buildings of more than special interest
II	Buildings that are of special interest

== Listing ==
Name	Grade	Location	Type	Completed (Note: The date given is the date used by Historic England as significant for the initial building or that of an important part in the structure's description.)	Date designated	Grid ref. (Note: The grid reference is based on the British national grid reference system, sometimes known as OSGB36, used by the Ordnance Survey.) Geo-coordinates	Notes	Entry number (Note: The "List Entry Number" is a unique number assigned to each listed building and scheduled monument by Historic England.)	Image	Wikidata
Spuckles	II				28 August 1986	TQ9708656868; 51°16′37″N 0°49′28″E		1069272	Upload Photo	Q26322122
Arnolds Oak Farmhouse	II	Arnolds Oak			24 January 1967	TQ9712155652; 51°15′57″N 0°49′27″E		1069232	Upload Photo	Q26322053
Huntingfield	II	Back Lane			24 January 1967	TQ9714755020; 51°15′37″N 0°49′27″E		1069233	Upload Photo	Q26322055
The Old Rectory	II	Eastling Road, ME13 0AN			28 August 1986	TQ9638756781; 51°16′35″N 0°48′51″E		1069234	Upload Photo	Q26322057
North Court Farmhouse	II	1-2, Faversham Road			24 January 1967	TQ9671657007; 51°16′42″N 0°49′09″E		1343971	Upload Photo	Q26627732
Kettle Hill Farmhouse	II	Kettle Hill			28 August 1986	TQ9666055531; 51°15′54″N 0°49′03″E		1343972	Upload Photo	Q26627733
North Eastling Farmhouse	II	North Eastling Hill			28 August 1986	TQ9676857810; 51°17′08″N 0°49′13″E		1069235	Upload Photo	Q26322059
New House Farmhouse	II	Otterden Road			28 August 1986	TQ9598755924; 51°16′08″N 0°48′29″E		1343973	Upload Photo	Q26627734
Skiltons	II	Otterden Road			28 August 1986	TQ9596355514; 51°15′54″N 0°48′27″E		1069236	Upload Photo	Q26322061
The Greeting	II	Otterden Road			28 August 1986	TQ9564555393; 51°15′51″N 0°48′10″E		1069237	Upload Photo	Q26322063
Tong Cottage	II	Pig Green			28 August 1986	TQ9546156243; 51°16′19″N 0°48′03″E		1054933	Upload Photo	Q26306578
Box Cottage	II*	School Lane			24 January 1967	TQ9637856494; 51°16′25″N 0°48′50″E		1054867	Upload Photo	Q17546175
Church of St Mary	II*	School Lane	church building		24 January 1967	TQ9652256555; 51°16′27″N 0°48′58″E		1343974	Church of St Mary More images	Q17546530
Divan Court	II	School Lane			28 August 1986	TQ9651056616; 51°16′29″N 0°48′57″E		1054891	Upload Photo	Q26306539
Eastling Manor	II*	School Lane	manor house		27 August 1952	TQ9626356518; 51°16′26″N 0°48′45″E		1069239	Eastling Manor More images	Q17546238
Headstone 15 Metres South West of West Door of Church of St Mary	II	School Lane			28 August 1986	TQ9649556540; 51°16′27″N 0°48′57″E		1367034	Upload Photo	Q26648568
Headstone 20 Metres South of South Chapel of Church of St Mary	II	School Lane			28 August 1986	TQ9653256537; 51°16′27″N 0°48′58″E		1343935	Upload Photo	Q26627697
Headstone 25 Metres South of South Chapel of Church of St Mary	II	School Lane			28 August 1986	TQ9653256533; 51°16′27″N 0°48′58″E		1054884	Upload Photo	Q26306532
Headstone 30 Metres South of South Chapel of Church of St Mary	II	School Lane			28 August 1986	TQ9653356523; 51°16′26″N 0°48′58″E		1069238	Upload Photo	Q26322065
Manor Cottage	II	School Lane			28 August 1986	TQ9637156502; 51°16′26″N 0°48′50″E		1343936	Upload Photo	Q26627698
2-4, the Street	II	2-4, The Street			28 August 1986	TQ9631456636; 51°16′30″N 0°48′47″E		1054824	Upload Photo	Q26306477
Carpenters Arms Inn	II	The Street	pub		24 January 1967	TQ9627356578; 51°16′28″N 0°48′45″E		1069242	Carpenters Arms Inn More images	Q26322071
Forge House	II	The Street			28 August 1986	TQ9636256704; 51°16′32″N 0°48′50″E		1367056	Upload Photo	Q26648589
Kings Cottages	II	1 and 2, The Street			28 August 1986	TQ9635856687; 51°16′32″N 0°48′50″E		1069240	Upload Photo	Q26322067
Plantation House	II	The Street			24 January 1967	TQ9628456596; 51°16′29″N 0°48′46″E		1343937	Upload Photo	Q26627699
Porch House	II	The Street			24 January 1967	TQ9634656681; 51°16′32″N 0°48′49″E		1069241	Upload Photo	Q26322069
Wooden Cottage	II	The Street			28 August 1986	TQ9627056595; 51°16′29″N 0°48′45″E		1367102	Upload Photo	Q26648631
K6 Telephone Kiosk	II	The Street (to South Of Orchard House)			8 October 1989	TQ9629456603; 51°16′29″N 0°48′46″E		1343987	Upload Photo	Q26627745
Tong House	II	Tong Lane			24 January 1967	TQ9594656236; 51°16′18″N 0°48′28″E		1054811	Upload Photo	Q26306462

== See also ==
- Grade I listed buildings in Kent
- Grade II* listed buildings in Kent

== Sources ==
- Newman, John (2013) [1969], Kent: North-East and East, The Buildings of England, New Haven and London: Yale University Press, ISBN 978-0-300-18506-5
