= Simon Townley =

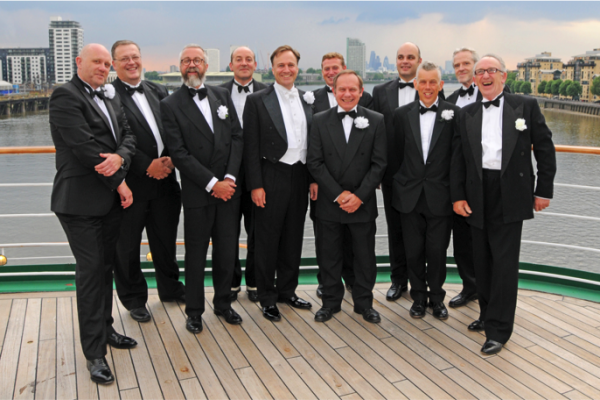
Townley, featured front row, second from the right, with the rest of the Pasadena Roof Orchestra and their lead singer Duncan Galloway.

Simon Andrew Townley is a British pianist and composer.

Townley was born in 1963 and read music at Worcester College, Oxford. He has been the pianist for the Pasadena Roof Orchestra since 1992 and the pianist and musical director for Beyond Broadway.

He has written scores for television programs, musicals, and the operetta Too Little Toulouse. He wrote the music for a children's stage show, Shaun's Big Show. Townley has presented programs on BBC Radio 4 and the BBC World Service. He "vividly recalled" violinist Tom Jenkins in one broadcast. Others explored page-turners for pianists and trains as an influence on composers.
