= St Cadoc's Church, Llangattock-juxta-Usk =

Coordinates: 51.7815°N 2.9721°W

St Cadoc's Church, Llangattock-Juxta-Usk, Monmouthshire
- Church of St Cadoc
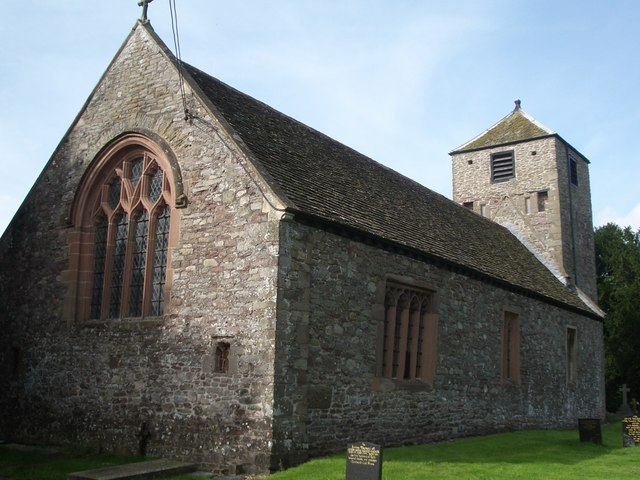
- The nave and tower

- Location in Monmouthshire
- Location: Llangattock-Juxta-Usk, Monmouthshire
- Country: Wales
- Denomination: Church in Wales

History
- Status: Parish church
- Founded: C15th century

Architecture
- Functional status: Active
- Heritage designation: Grade II*
- Designated: 9 January 1956
- Architectural type: Perpendicular

Administration
- Diocese: Monmouth
- Archdeaconry: Monmouth
- Deanery: Abergavenny
- Parish: Llangattock-Juxta-Usk

Clergy
- Vicar: The Reverend J Humphries

The Church of St Cadoc, Llangattock-Juxta-Usk, Monmouthshire is a parish church with its datable origins in the 15th century. The church was restored in 1827 and again in 1864–5. It is a Grade II* listed building.

== History ==
The church sits just south of the River Usk, next to the small hamlet of The Bryn. There is nothing datable before the 15th century, although its origins are earlier. The building was reconstructed in 1827 by the Gloucestershire engineer John Upton and restored in the mid-19th century by John Prichard. It has been little altered since that time and remains an active parish church.

== Architecture and description ==
The church is constructed of Old Red Sandstone. The style is Perpendicular. The interior of the church is "very plain" but contains a surprising collection of medieval wall tiles, one dated to 1456, which are similar to those found in the, more significant, priory churches of St Mary's Priory Church, Monmouth, Tintern Abbey and the Church of St David, Llanthony. The architectural historian John Newman noted that their presence in "this modest parish church has not been explained". The church is a Grade II* listed building.
