= Sign cricket =

British car game

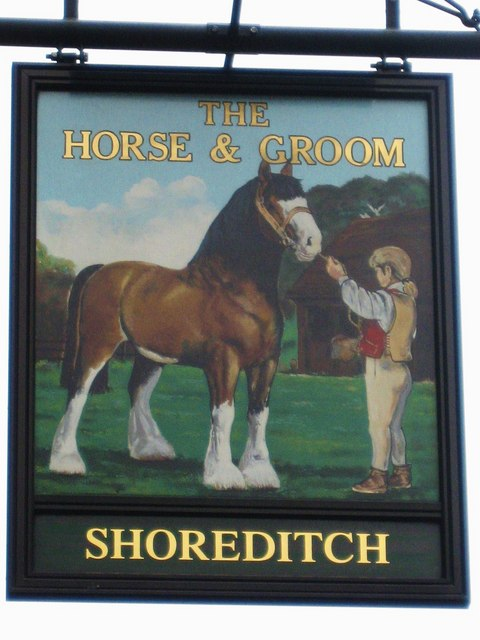
The Horse and Groom pub would score 6 runs: 4 runs for the four-legged horse, plus 2 for the two-legged groom

Sign cricket (also called pub cricket) is a car game which is played in the United Kingdom and other countries with a sufficient number of suitably named pubs. Players score points by spotting pub signs: the score is equal to the total number of physical legs belonging to the people or animals in the pub's name. (For example, the King George would be worth two points.)

== Rules ==
There are several variations of the rules. A basic version is described in the 1966 AA Book of the Road. Taking it in turns during a journey, one player bats. This means he looks for pubs which the car passes. When one is found he gets a run (point) for each physical leg possessed by the subject of the title of the pub. Thus "The Jolly Sailor", a biped, gets 2 points whilst "The White Horse", a quadruped, gets 4. If a pub's name is that of an object or concept with no legs, it scores no points. A player is out if the pub name includes the word "arms" or "head" (e.g. "The King's Head", "The Baker's Arms"), and it is the next player's turn. The game ends at the end of the journey. The player with the highest score wins.

=== Disputes ===
Disputes can occur with many pub signs. For example, is "Hogshead" out (the head of a hog) or no points (the type of barrel known as a hogshead)? Does the "Highwayman's Arms" get a player out, treating "arms" as naming the highwayman's front limbs, or two points, counting his legs and treating "arms" as referring to his weapons? Is "King Henry's Rest" two points because of the King or no points because the "Rest" is an inanimate object? How many horses are there in "Coach and Horses"? Does the slug in "The Slug and Lettuce" have one leg or no legs?

These disputes can be resolved by mutual agreement as they arise but players may prefer to agree house rules in advance. There are three ways to handle signs with plural nouns such as "The Coach and Horses": (1) agree that any ill-defined plural noun counts as two of that object (so two horses, for eight points); (2) count the horses on the picture outside the pub (e.g. four horses get 16 points); or (3) agree in advance that ill-defined groups such as "The Coach and Horses" or "The Cavaliers" count a certain number of runs (e.g. six or ten).

=== Numberplate cricket ===
One variation on this game scores 'runs' based on car number plates. When the driver gets behind another car, the number plate is examined, and the number plate either scores runs or wickets. The numbers in the plate are added together and multiplied by the number of vowels in the plate. If the answer is 0, then a wicket falls. For example:

- AB02XYZ – numbers added together = 2, × 1 vowel = 2 runs
- A999EOU = 9+9+9 (27) × 4 = 108
- FG04SDF = 4 × 0 = 0 (wicket)

Play continues until the batter loses 10 wickets, then the next player bats.

== High-scoring pubs ==
Of commonly occurring pub signs, amongst the best are "The Seven Swans" (14 points) and "Fox and Hounds" (12 points). Some unusual pub names can score far more – "The Twenty Church Wardens", in Cockley Cley, Norfolk, scores 40 points and "The Million Hare", in Woolwich, scored 4 million points in the basic version of the game until it was renamed.

"The Cricketers" scores four points (the number of cricketers is unspecified, so assume two) but "The Cricket Team", if it existed, would score 22 (there are eleven cricketers on a cricket team). "The Eleven Cricketers" at Storrington in Sussex, now closed, did score 22 runs since the number of cricketers was specified.

The "Duke of York's Men" can be argued to fetch 20,000 points, by reference to the nursery rhyme, but can also be argued to score only four points as the name does not specify how many men. Similarly, "The Beehive" could be argued to equal 60000 points, as there would be at least 10,000 bees in a beehive; conversely it could be argued to gain twelve points as the number of bees are not specified. It could also be argued that the beehive is the hive itself and therefore scores no points. Finally, it could also simply be used as a convenient way to declare a winner, especially if one was, anyway, having a pub lunch.

== Example game ==
Alice and Bob play the game using the basic version and handling plurals using method (1). Alice is in.

- The Fox – 4 points (4)
- Henry IV – 2 points (6)
- The Oak Tree – 0 points (6)
- Coach and Horses – 8 points, because we assume two horses and no passengers (14)
- King's Head – Alice is out with 14 points, Bob is in
- The Crown and Anchor – 0 points (0)
- The Red Lion – 4 points (4)
- The Three Horseshoes – 0 points (4)
- The Carpenter's Arms – Bob is out with 4 points, Alice is back in
- The Pig and Rooster – 6 points (20)
- The Baker's Arms – Alice is out with 20 points, Bob is back in
- The Zebra – 4 points (8)
- The Fox and Hounds – 12 points, because we assume one fox and two hounds (20)
- The Silver Star – 0 points (20)
- The Wrestlers – 4 points, because we assume two wrestlers (24)
- The County Arms – Bob is out with 4 points, Alice is back in
- Sir Isaac Newton – 2 points (22)

The journey ends. Bob wins with 24 points to Alice's 22.
