= Eastling =

Village in Kent, England

Coordinates: 51.266666°N 0.816667°E

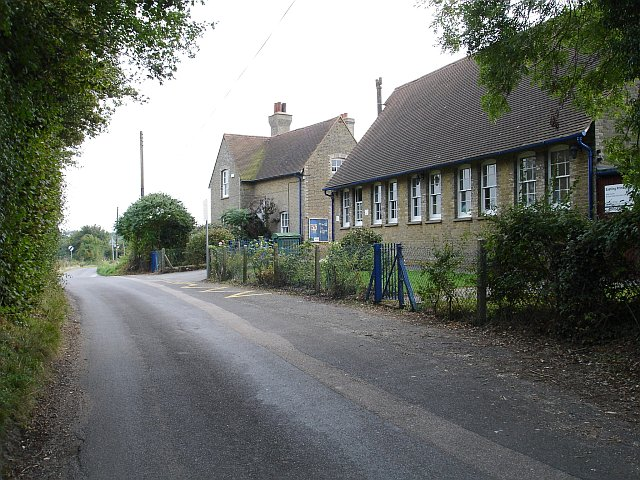
- Eastling County Primary school. Standing on Kettle Hill Road on the southeastern edge of the village.

- Location within Kent
- Population: 365 (2011 census)
- District: Swale
- Shire county: Kent
- Region: South East
- Country: England
- Sovereign state: United Kingdom
- Post town: Faversham
- Postcode district: ME13
- Police: Kent
- Fire: Kent
- Ambulance: South East Coast
- UK Parliament: Faversham and Mid Kent

Eastling is a small village 4½ miles to the southwest of Faversham, Kent in England. It is set in a designated Area of Outstanding Natural Beauty on the slope of the North Downs.

The village's Conservation Area boasts some excellent buildings and gardens, and the Eastling Manor House.

== St Mary's Church ==
The village church of St Mary's is believed to have been built on the foundations of an earlier place of worship before the 11th century. The oldest surviving parts are the base of the southwest tower, the nave and the western part of the chancel. The chancel was extended eastwards in the 14th century to create a sanctuary. About the same time, the St Katherine Chapel and an arcade were added to the southeast corner.

The nave, north aisle and south arcade were substantially rebuilt by the architect R.C. Hussey in 1855–56; the west porch added and the nave re-roofed. St Mary's box pews, pulpit, lectern, rector's stall and choir stalls all date from that era.

== Eastling school ==
Eastling County Primary School opened on Kettle Hill on 7 February 1881 with 80 children. The first head was Bessie Higham; from February 2002 until 2017 it was Dave Walsh, and as of 2017 it is Allison Dale. It replaced a schoolhouse built before 1842 in Newnham Lane and which doubled as a church hall.

Currently (January 2020) the school has a roll fluctuating around 100 pupils with spaces for 15 new pupils each year at ages 4 and 5.

== Transport ==
A public bus service (the number 660) links the village to Faversham, every day except Sundays.

== See also ==
- Listed buildings in Eastling
