= Llanellen =

Coordinates: 51°47′N 3°01′W

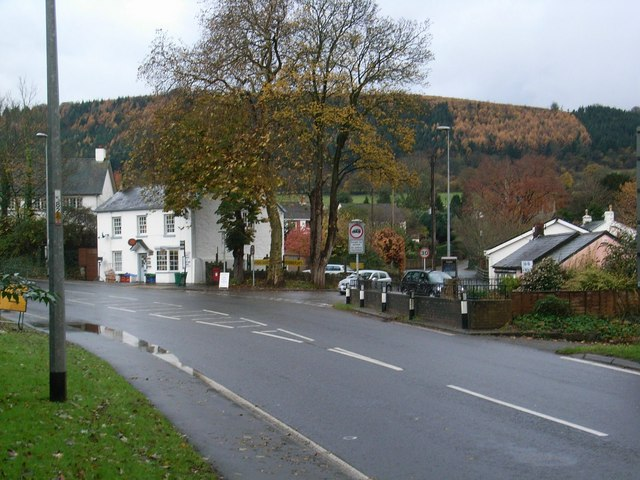

- Location within Monmouthshire
- Principal area: Monmouthshire
- Preserved county: Gwent
- Country: Wales
- Sovereign state: United Kingdom
- Post town: USK
- Postcode district: NP
- Police: Gwent
- Fire: South Wales
- Ambulance: Welsh
- UK Parliament: Monmouth

Llanellen (Welsh: Llanelen) is a village in Monmouthshire, south-east Wales, United Kingdom. It is located three miles (4.8 km) south of Abergavenny. The population was 506 in 2011.

== Geography ==
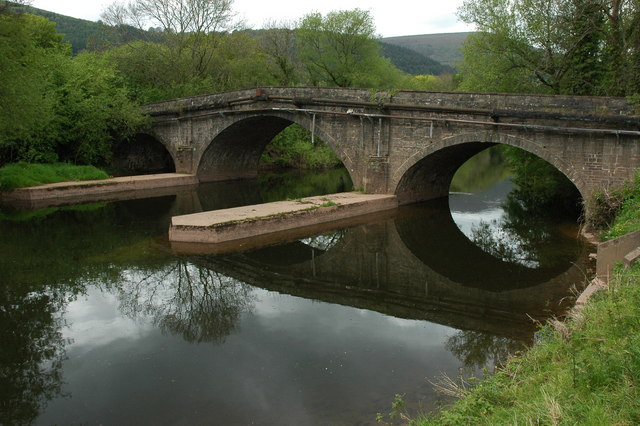
Llanellen Bridge

The Blorenge mountain towers above the village. The River Usk passes close by, crossed by a bridge built in 1821 by John Upton, who also built the nearby Pant-y-Goitre Bridge. The Monmouthshire and Brecon Canal passes through Llanellen.

== History and amenities ==
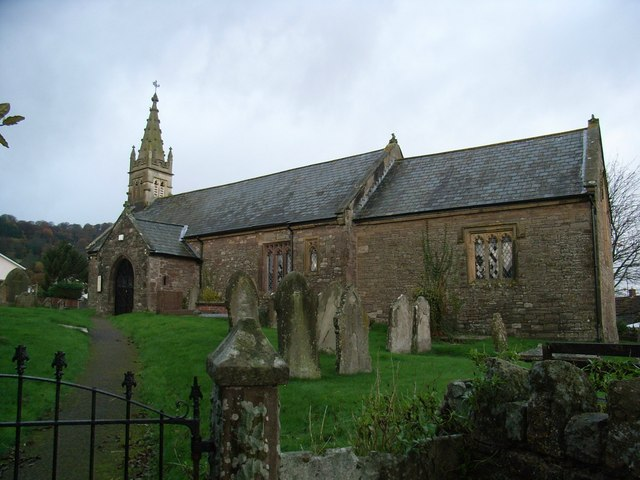
Llanellen church

The church of St Helen possibly dates back to the 13th century, though the church was largely re-built in Perpendicular style in the mid-19th century by architect John Prichard. In the churchyard is the grave of Sir Thomas Phillips, Mayor of Newport at the time of the Newport Rising in 1839, and a prominent defender of Welsh language and education, who lived in nearby Llanellen House.
