= Llanfair Kilgeddin =

Coordinates: 51.758056°N 2.944444°W

Llanfair Kilgeddin: Welsh: Llanfair Cilgedin
- Location within Monmouthshire
- OS grid reference: SO350075
- Principal area: Monmouthshire
- Preserved county: Gwent
- Country: Wales
- Sovereign state: United Kingdom
- Post town: ABERGAVENNY
- Postcode district: NP7
- Dialling code: 01873
- Police: Gwent
- Fire: South Wales
- Ambulance: Welsh
- UK Parliament: Monmouth

Llanfair Kilgeddin (Welsh: Llanfair Cilgedin) is a small village in Monmouthshire, south east Wales, lying within the administrative community of Llanover. It is located four miles north west of Usk and six miles south east of Abergavenny on the B4598 road. The River Usk passes close by.

== History and notable buildings ==
A Norman motte and bailey castle site remains near the village.

=== St Mary's ===
The parish church, Church of St Mary the Virgin, Llanfair Kilgeddin, is located about 1 mile (1.6 km) north of the village.

=== Pant-y-Goitre House ===
Pant-y-Goitre is a country house thought to date to around 1776. It stands to the north of the village. The villa is a Grade II listed building, and the gardens and park were listed on the Cadw/ICOMOS Register of Parks and Gardens of Special Historic Interest in Wales.

=== Brynderwen ===
Brynderwen is a country house dating from the Victorian period. It stands to the west of the village, across the River Usk. The house is unlisted, but its gardens and park are included at Grade II on the Cadw/ICOMOS Register of Parks and Gardens of Special Historic Interest in Wales.

== Gallery ==
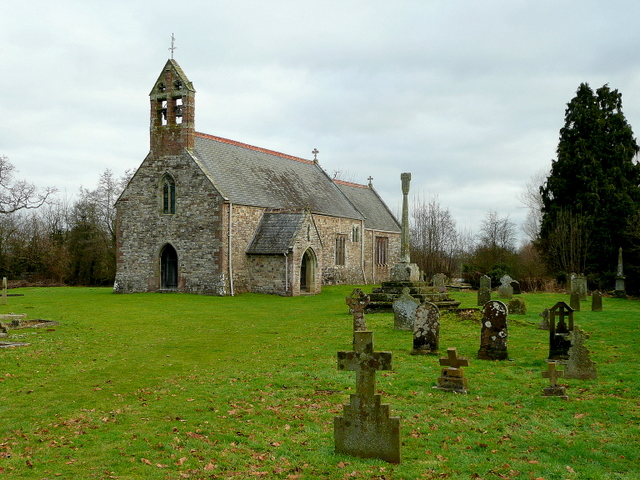
St Mary's

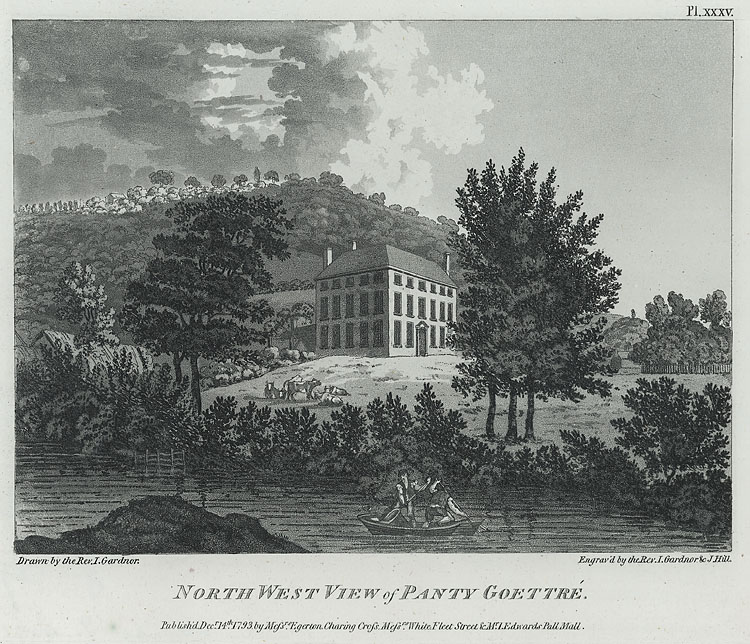
Pant-y-Goitre House

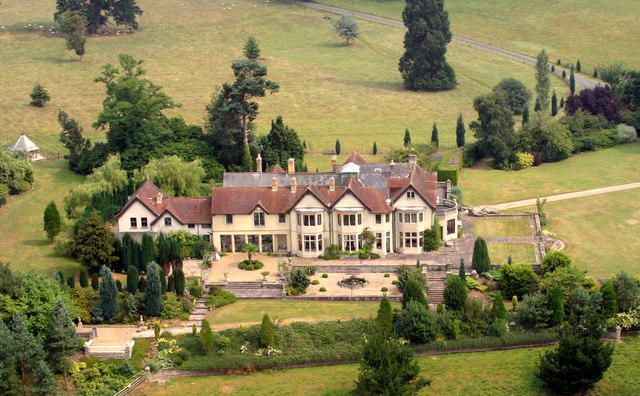
Brynderwen

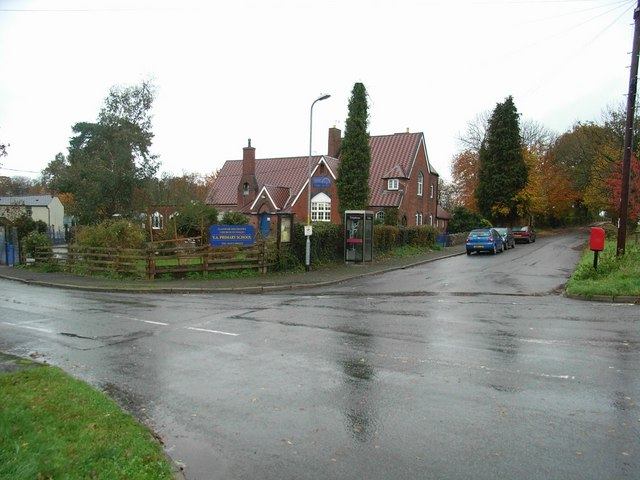
Llanfair Kilgeddin School

== Sources ==
- Newman, John (2000). Gwent/Monmouthshire. The Buildings of Wales. Penguin. ISBN 0-14-071053-1.
