= John Upton (civil engineer) =

John Upton (c. 1774 – 1851) was born in Petworth, Sussex, England. He was a civil engineer and contractor working on roads, canals and ports first in England and later in Russia.

== English career ==
His father, John Upton, was a surveyor to the George Wyndham, 3rd Earl of Egremont at Petworth House. The Earl took a great interest in road and waterway improvements. It seems probable that the young Upton gained basic engineering skills partly from his father and from working on schemes sponsored by the Earl. In 1815 he was working on the stalled project to build a canal from Gloucester to join the river Severn at Berkeley. He published a plan that the canal should join the river at Sharpness rather than Berkeley – a plan that was eventually adopted.

He was also working as a construction contractor, principally in South Wales. By 1819 he had become surveyor for part of the London to Holyhead road running from Stony Stratford (Buckinghamshire), to Dunchurch (Warwickshire) under the overall direction of Thomas Telford who seems to have had a high regard for Upton's engineering skills.

== Criminal dealings ==
In 1818 he was dismissed from the Gloucester and Sharpness canal project for improper procurement of construction materials. An audit of the Dunchurch road construction work in early 1826 showed that he had defrauded the project of over £1,000. He was charged to appear at Northampton Assizes but was allowed bail. The day before his trial in July 1826 he absconded and made his way to the Russian legation in London who were keen to recruit engineers for their Black Sea expansion. Upton's assistant, Clement Clarke, stood trial but was sentenced to a modest 6 months imprisonment because he worked under direction. Not only had Upton defrauded the road project but he had also obtained £3,000 from his wife's relations which he did not repay and had defaulted on his franchise for the Daventry post office leaving his surety to pay £300.

== Russian career ==
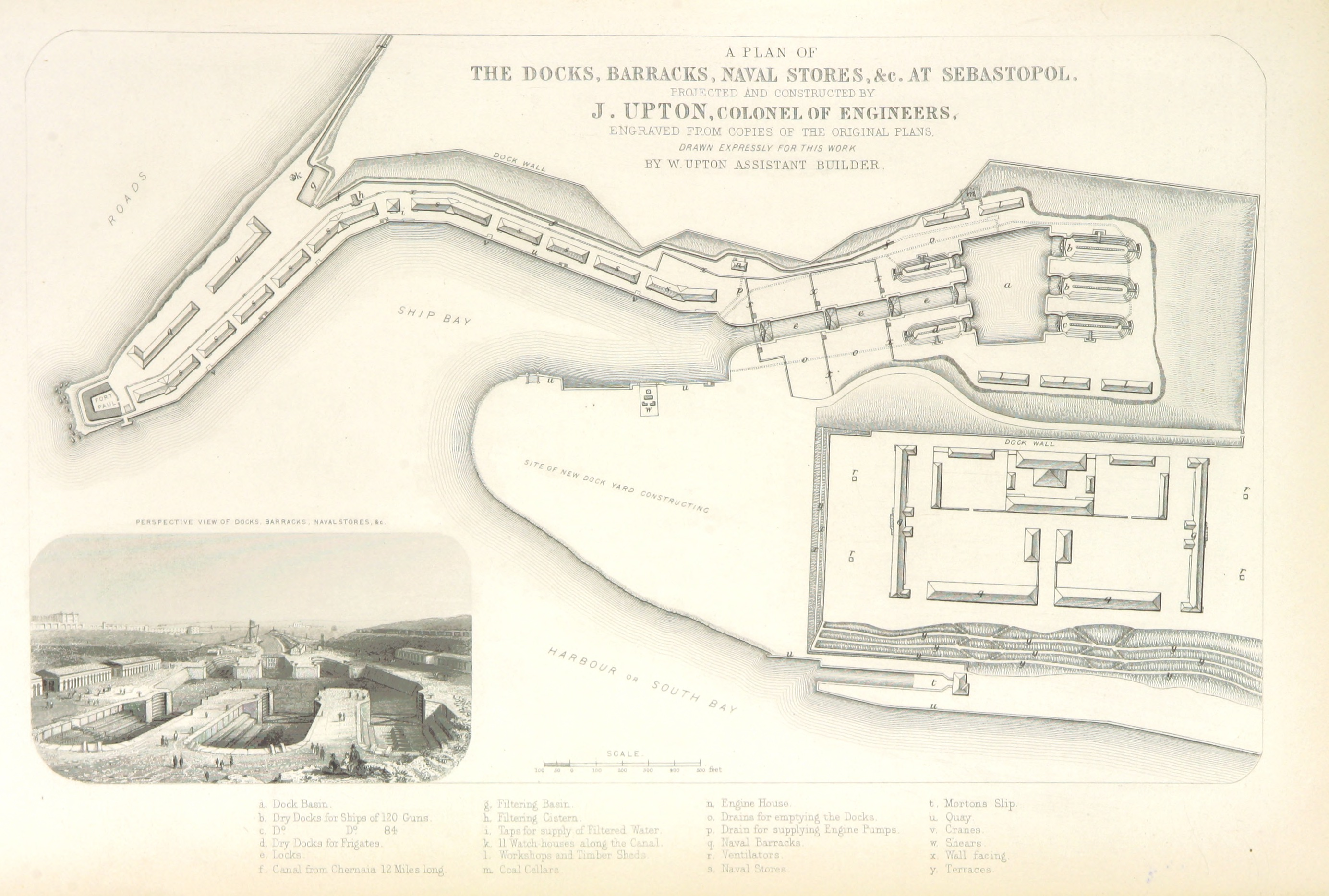
A plan of the docks, barracks, naval stores at Sevastopol

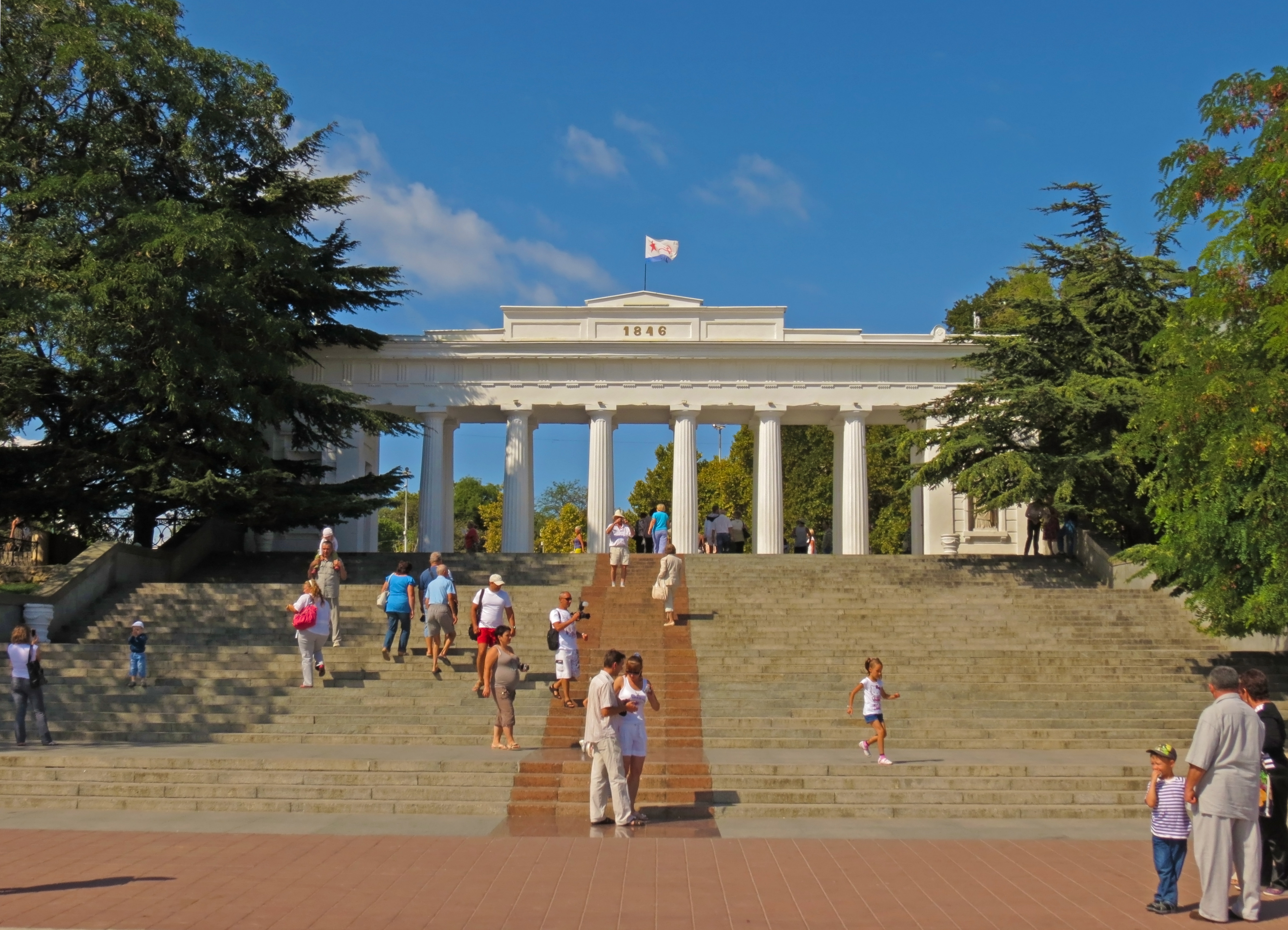
Grafskaya Wharf in Sevastopol

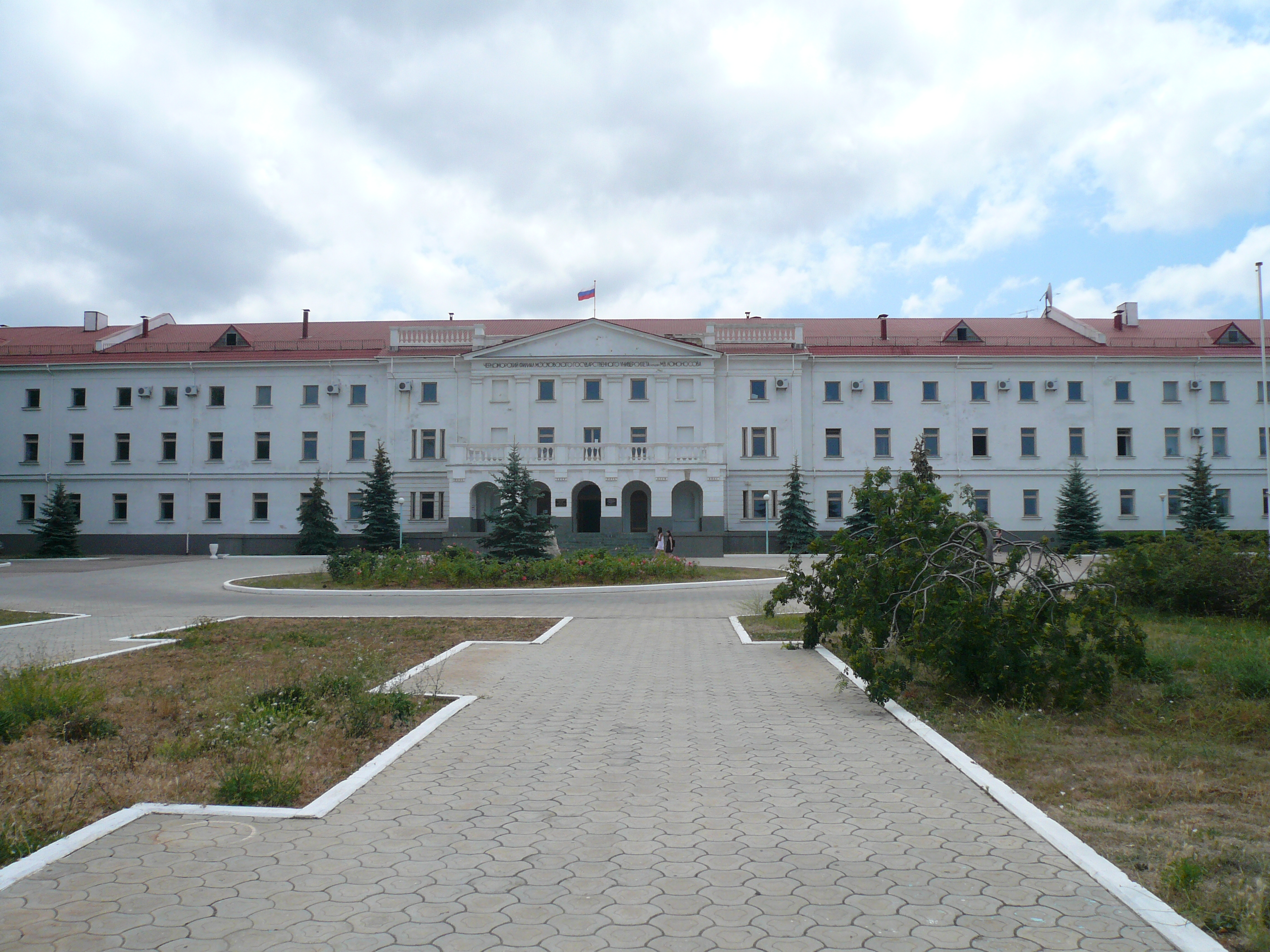
Lazarev Barracks, now Sevastopol branch of Moscow State University

Upton was able to make Sevastopol harbour accessible to large ships where others had failed. He designed the water supply, road layout and many features of Sevastopol town and harbour including the Grafskaya Quay, He had been commissioned as an engineering officer and rose to the rank of Colonel Engineer. In Odessa he built the Primorsky Stairs designed earlier by a Russian architect. In Russia he was assisted by his sons John, William, Thomas and Samuel who went on to become an architect and Russian academician. John Upton worked extensively in Sevastopol to build a huge set of dry docks for the Russian Black Sea Fleet. These docks were completed just before the outbreak of the Crimean War. At the conclusion of the siege of Sevastopol, the Dry Docks were destroyed by British and French soldiers. During the Crimean War William Upton was held for a short time by the British military who hoped he would reveal details of Sevastopol harbour defences.

== Works ==
- Llanellen Bridge
- Pant-y-Goitre Bridge
