= Plantagenet (disambiguation) =

The House of Plantagenet was a royal house founded by Geoffrey V of Anjou.

Plantagenet may refer to:

== History ==
- Angevin Empire, also referred to as the Plantagenet Empire, a modern term describing the collection of states once ruled by the Angevin-Plantagenet dynasty
- Armorial of Plantagenet, the coats of arms known or believed to be borne by Geoffrey V of Anjou and his descendants
- House of Lancaster Plantagenet house of Lancaster, a branch of the royal House of Plantagenet
- House of York Plantagenet house of York, a branch of the royal House of Plantagenet

== Geography ==
- Alfred and Plantagenet, a township in Ontario, Canada
  - Plantagenet, Ontario, a community in Alfred and Plantagenet
- Plantagenet County, Queensland, Australia
- Electoral district of Plantagenet, a historical electoral district in Western Australia
- Plantagenet County, Western Australia
- Plantagenet Land District, a land district of Western Australia
- Shire of Plantagenet, a local government area in Western Australia
- Lake Plantagenet, a lake in Minnesota, US

== Other uses ==
- The Plantagenets, a 2014 BBC miniseries about the dynasty
- HMS Plantagenet (1801), a 74-gun third rate ship of the line of the Royal Navy
- Plantagenet (radio plays), a sequence of radio plays by Mike Walker
- Plantagenet style, an architectural building design of churches and cathedrals during the 12th century

== People with the name ==
- Arthur Plantagenet, 1st Viscount Lisle, a son of King Edward IV of England
- Cecily Plantagenet, more commonly known as Cecily of York, an English Princess
- Geoffrey Plantagenet, Count of Anjou, the founder of this house
- Hamelin Plantagenet, more commonly known as Hamelin de Warenne, Earl of Surrey
- Henry Plantagenet, most commonly known as Henry II of England, the first of the House of Plantagenet to rule England
- Honor Plantagenet, Viscountess Lisle, an English lady-in-waiting during the reign of Henry VIII
- John Plantagenet, more commonly known as John of Lancaster, 1st Duke of Bedford
- Mary Plantagenet, more commonly known as Mary of Waltham
- Philippa Plantagenet, more commonly known as Philippa, 5th Countess of Ulster
- Plantagenet Somerset Fry, born Peter George Robin Fry, a British historian
- William Plantagenet, more commonly known as William de Warenne, 5th Earl of Surrey

=== Fictional ===
- Plantagenet Palliser, a character in the Palliser series of novels

== See also ==
- Alfred and Plantagenet, a township in eastern Ontario, Canada
- List of members of the House of Plantagenet
- Catherine Plantagenet (disambiguation)
- Edmund Plantagenet (disambiguation),
- Edward Plantagenet (disambiguation)
- Eleanor Plantagenet (disambiguation)
- Elizabeth Plantagenet (disambiguation)
- Geoffrey Plantagenet (disambiguation)
- George Plantagenet (disambiguation)
- Humphrey Plantagenet (disambiguation)
- Joan of England (disambiguation)
- Margaret Plantagenet (disambiguation)
- Richard Plantagenet (disambiguation)
- The Nation, Ontario or South Plantagenet, a community
