= December 1950 =

Month of 1950

<<	December 1950					>>
Su	Mo	Tu	We	Th	Fr	Sa
					1	2
3	4	5	6	7	8	9
10	11	12	13	14	15	16
17	18	19	20	21	22	23
24	25	26	27	28	29	30
31

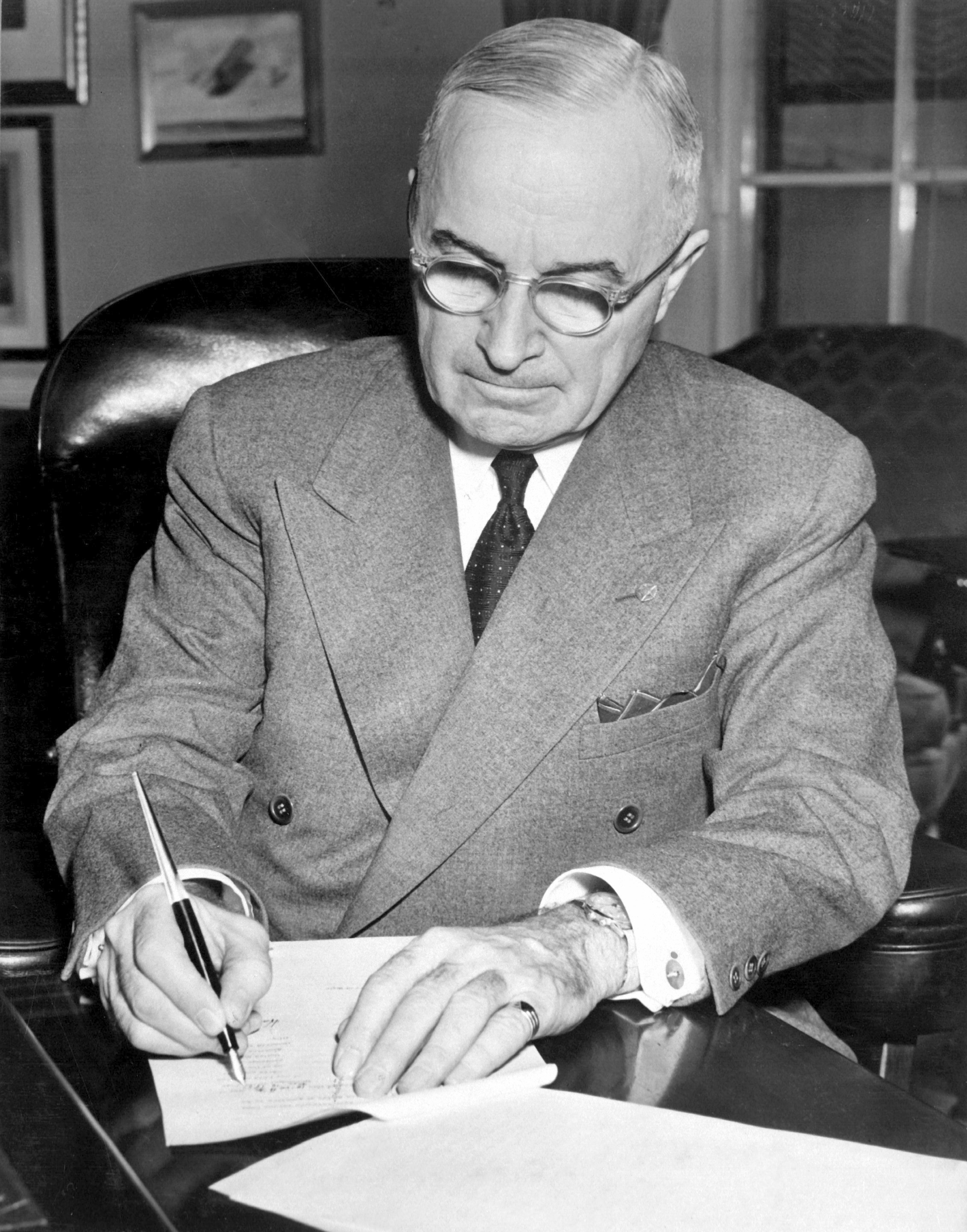
December 16, 1950: U.S. President Truman declares national emergency

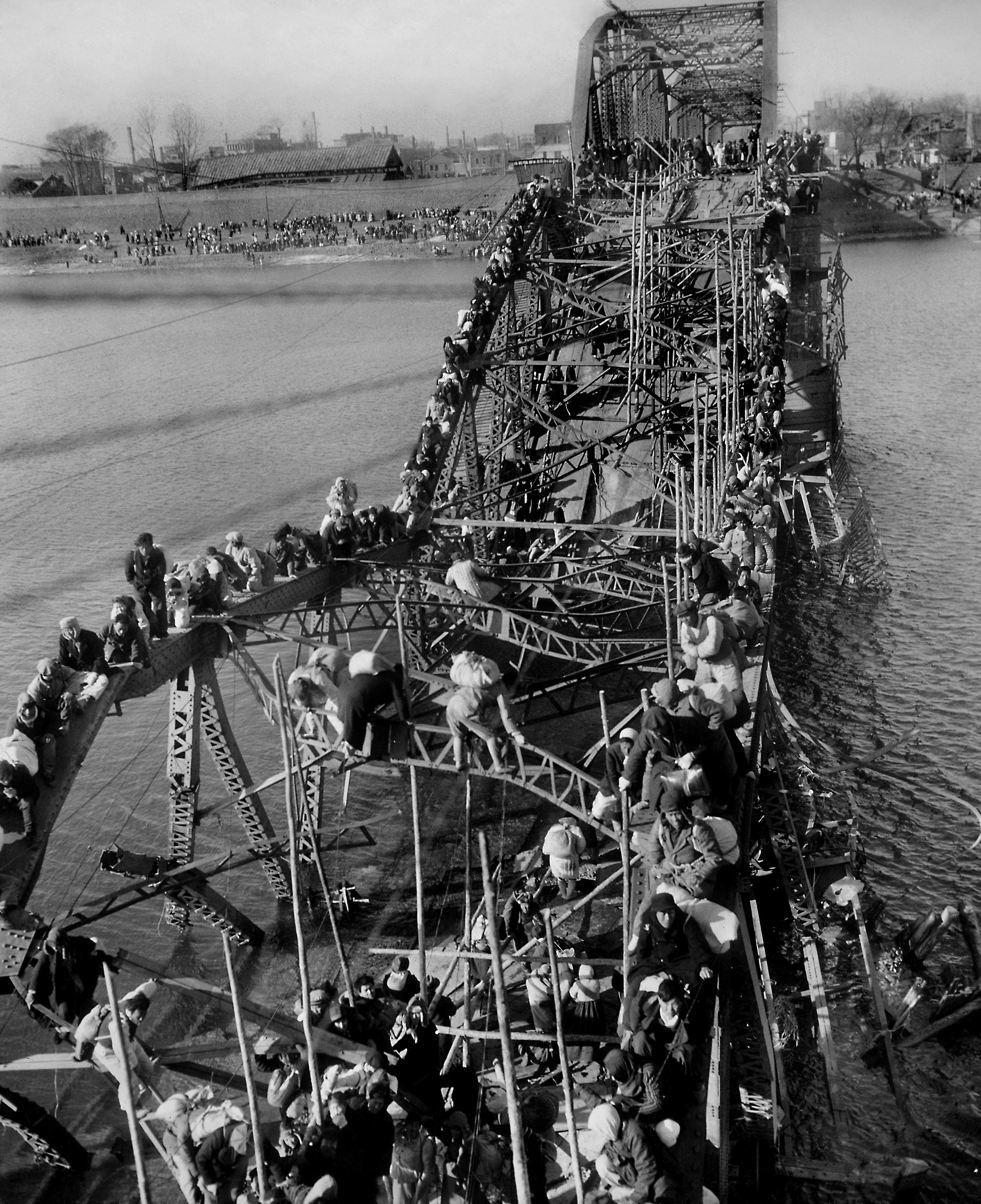
December 4, 1950: Flight of Refugees Across Wrecked Bridge in Korea photographed by Max Defor.

The following events occurred in December 1950:

== December 1, 1950 (Friday) ==
- A fire destroyed the Xi'anmen Gate, known as the "Gate of Western Peace", which protected the Forbidden City in Beijing during the Ming Dynasty and the Qing Dynasty of the Chinese Empire. The municipal government of the Chinese capital had been planning to dismantle the gate in order to improve traffic.
- Near Cairo, a villager who had been digging a ditch found the tomb of the High Priest of Heliopolis, Ra-Djaa. French Egyptologist Étienne Drioton announced the discovery of the sarcophagus the next day, and said that the hieroglyphic inscriptions on the wall of the tomb identified Ra-Djaa's name and office, as well as confirming that the priest had died around 660 B.C., during the beginning of Egypt's 26th Dynasty, when Psamtik I was the Pharaoh.
- The Federal Civil Defense Administration was created by Executive Order 10186 by U.S. President Harry S. Truman. In 1958, its functions would be assumed by the Office of Defense Mobilization.
- The United States Air Force removed the Tactical Air Command from the control of the Continental Air Command. The Tactical Air Command returned to the status of a major command for the first time since December 1948.
- Born:
  - Richard Keith (real name, Keith Thibodeaux), American child actor who portrayed "Little Ricky" on the classic comedy I Love Lucy; in Lafayette, Louisiana.
  - Themba Dlamini, Prime Minister of Swaziland from 2003 to 2008 and businessman

== December 2, 1950 (Saturday) ==
- Eritrea was made part of a federation with Ethiopia by a 46 to 10 vote of the United Nations General Assembly, to take effect in two years. The predominantly Muslim Eritrea did not adapt to becoming a semi-autonomous unit within Christian Ethiopia, and the Eritrean War of Independence would be fought from 1961 to 1991 until the United Nations would oversee the transition of Eritrea to becoming a sovereign nation.
- The Libyan National Assembly, set up under the auspices of the United Nations, voted unanimously to create a federal monarchy as the form of government when the former Italian colony was to become independent, with Tripolitania, Cyrenaica and Fezzan falling under the rule of the Emir Idris I of the Cyrenaica Emirate.
- The Battle of the Ch'ongch'on River ended with the Chinese People's Volunteer Army expelling United Nations forces from North Korea.
- The Eighth United States Army, under the command of General Walton Walker, began "the longest retreat in United States military history", destroying whatever equipment and supplies it could not take with it, as the American troops pulled back from Chinese troops advancing into North Korea.
- Navy, with a record of only 2 wins and 6 losses, defeated previously unbeaten Army, 14 to 2 in a stunning upset at the annual Army–Navy Game, in front of 101,000 spectators (including President Harry S. Truman) at Philadelphia Municipal Stadium. The Midshipmen snapped the Cadets' 28-game winning streak which had started more than three years earlier.
- Captain W. E. Banks was appointed the first Commander of the Royal Ceylon Navy.
- The science fiction short story collection I, Robot by Isaac Asimov was published.
- The novelty song "The Thing" by Phil Harris hit #1 on the Billboard Best Sellers in Stores chart.
- Born:
  - Paul Watson, Canadian environmental activist and founder of Sea Shepherd Conservation Society; in Toronto
  - Benjamin Stora, French historian and expert on the history of North Africa; in Constantine, French Algeria
- Died: Dinu Lipatti, 33, Romanian pianist and composer, (from Hodgkin's disease)

== December 3, 1950 (Sunday) ==
- The carrier aircraft of U.S. Navy Task Force 77 were tasked solely with support to United Nations ground forces in northern Korea retreating in the face of the Chinese offensive toward an evacuation at Hungnam, flying reconnaissance missions, attacking Chinese positions, and escorting military transport aircraft flying supplies into Hagaru-ri. Air controllers handled 359 U.N. aircraft on this day, most of them from Task Force 77.
- The first reports of stimulant drug use by members of the Chinese People's Volunteer Army were made by American soldiers who were recovering at an evacuation hospital following their retreat. Sixteen patients reported that the soldiers carried the drugs in small tins. One American reported that each soldier carried "a little larger than a pack of cigarettes... they chew it like chewing gum. It makes them act crazy." Others added that "They'd blow a bugle about dark and in about 30 minutes there they'd come, screaming like hell."
- The North Korean town of Huksu, located 26 miles (42 km) northwest of Hamhung, was "wiped off the map", according to Major Frank Smyth, a spokesman for the United States Marines. Major Smythe reported that Corsair and Mustang bombers were ordered to destroy the location after it had become a Chinese PVA stronghold and added that "a Korean town is missing".
- Four soldiers of the British Army were certain that they would be killed or captured after their weapons carrier stalled north of Pyongyang, and they had to drop out of their retreating convoy. Gunner Jimmy Moore of Coventry reported that, when the Chinese soldiers arrived, they helped the Britons push the truck until the engine could start, and that one of the enemy, who "spoke excellent English", told him, "We don't want to hurt you guys. We just want you to get off the peninsula."
- China made the third and final release of wounded American prisoners of war and allowed them to return to the retreating convoy, although they kept several officers of the same units, claiming that they would "buy them tickets from Shanghai to San Francisco". Two trucks brought the men to the American lines, and the men were told "Go back where you belong." A U.S. Army major commented, "It's pure propaganda, of course. But we got back 27 of our men."
- Sa`id al-Mufti resigned as Prime Minister of Jordan.
- Two referendums were held in Switzerland, one on revising article 72 of the constitution regarding the election of the National Council and the other a federal resolution on financial order between 1951 and 1954. Both measures were approved by voters. The second referendum was an extension of the income taxes that had originally been put in place while the rest of Europe had been fighting World War II, with the voters rejecting a tax cut in favor of avoiding a deficit.
- Conservative American radio broadcaster Paul Harvey began his six days a week radio commentary, Paul Harvey News and Comment. The program would continue for the next 58 years and would be on 1,200 radio stations at the height of its popularity.
- The Disenchanted by Budd Schulberg topped The New York Times Fiction Best Seller list.

== December 4, 1950 (Monday) ==
- At a meeting of the Cabinet of Robert Menzies, the Prime Minister of Australia, the ministers voted to designate the Union Jack on a blue ensign as the Australian National Flag, rather than the red ensign that had also been frequently used.
- The Fighter Squadron 32 (VF-32) F4U Corsair of the first African American naval aviator, U.S. Navy Ensign Jesse L. Brown, operating off of the aircraft carrier USS Leyte (CV-32), suddenly lost power while supporting the 1st Marine Division's breakout from the Chosin Reservoir, forcing Brown to make a hard crash-landing, in which he was injured. His wingman, Lieutenant, junior grade, Thomas J. Hudner, crash-landed his own Corsair near Brown's aircraft and attempted to help Brown, as did the pilot of a United States Marine Corps Sikorsky HO3S-1 helicopter that arrived later, but Brown died before they could extricate him from the wreckage. For his actions, Hudner became the first member of the U.S. Navy to receive the Medal of Honor during the Korean War.
- At a destroyed bridge over the Taedong River in Pyongyang, North Korea, Associated Press photographer Max Desfor took the photograph titled Flight of Refugees Across Wrecked Bridge in Korea, which would be named as "an outstanding example" of the photos for which Desfor would win the 1951 Pulitzer Prize for Photography.
- The eruption of a volcano, in the Caspian Sea of the Soviet Union, briefly created a new island, reported to be 300 feet wide, half a mile long, and 18 feet above the surface.
- Clement Attlee, the Prime Minister of the United Kingdom, made an emergency trip to the United States to meet with U.S. President Truman, after Truman had stated (at a November 30 press conference) that use of the atomic bomb was under consideration in the Korean War. Attlee and Truman conferred at the White House for 75 minutes at 4:00 pm, after the Prime Minister's airplane had landed in Washington at 9:41 that morning.
- Republican Congressman Richard Nixon took office as U.S. Senator from California following a bitter election campaign, having been appointed to the short remainder of the term of office of outgoing Democrat Sheridan Downey, who had resigned on November 30.
- In the Toronto municipal elections, incumbent mayor Hiram E. McCallum narrowly defeated Allan Lamport to win his fourth one-year term.
- A Pan American World Airways Boeing 307 Strato-Clipper set a new record time for a commercial flight from Honolulu, Hawaii, to Los Angeles, California, making the trip in 7 hours 20 minutes.

== December 5, 1950 (Tuesday) ==
- The last United Nations troops left Pyongyang, as the British 29th Independent Infantry Brigade covered the retreat of the U.S. 25th Infantry Division and the South Korean 1st Infantry Division troops that had been between the Yalu River and the North Korean capital, then destroyed all but one of the bridges over the Taedong River.
- Born: Camarón de la Isla, Spanish flamenco singer credited with revival of the genre in the 1970s; in San Fernando (d. 1992)
- Died:
  - Sri Aurobindo, 76, Indian nationalist, philosopher, yogi, guru, and poet
  - White House Press Secretary Charlie Ross died suddenly at the age of 65 after concluding a briefing to reporters about President Truman's meeting with Prime Minister Attlee. Ross was preparing to record some of his remarks for a television crew. When his secretary told him, "Don't mumble," he replied "You know I always speak very distinctly," then lit a cigarette. A moment later, he slumped back in his chair and died. Ross had been friends with Truman since the time that both of them had been in the third grade, in Independence, Missouri, and had gone on to become an editor with the St. Louis Post-Dispatch before becoming Truman's press spokesman.

== December 6, 1950 (Wednesday) ==
- The Washington Post music critic Paul Hume's review of a singing performance infuriated the father of the singer, who sent Hume a personal letter that made front-page news days later. The singer was 26-year old Margaret Truman, of whom Hume wrote, and added that "She cannot sing with anything approaching professional finish.". Her father happened to be the President of the United States; Harry S. Truman told Hume, "Some day I hope to meet you. When that happens you'll need a new nose, a lot of beefsteak for black eyes, and perhaps a supporter below!" Hume apparently bore no ill will, and noting that Truman's friend Charlie Ross had died the day before, commented, "I can only say that a man suffering the loss of a close friend and carrying the terrible burden of the present world crisis ought to be indulged in an occasional outburst of temper."
- Pope Pius XII published his encyclical Mirabile illud, taking the form of a crusade of prayer for peace, prompted by concerns about the ongoing Korean War.
- Paul Magloire was sworn into office as the 35th President of Haiti.
- The Joint Chiefs of Staff of the United States issued a directive to General Douglas MacArthur advising him to "exercise extreme caution" when making public statements, and to not speak to the press about military matters without approval from the JCS. Two days later, however, the Army Secretary softened the directive with the statement that "Intent of instructions not to prohibit speeches by military on suitable occasions...Dept of Army is prepared to assist with advice and clearances when you are in doubt." Violations of these orders would ultimately lead to General MacArthur being fired from the U.S. Army on April 11, 1951.
- Died: Pietro Lana, 62, original member of Italy's national soccer football team who scored the first goal in Italy's first international game (May 15, 1910, in a 6–2 win over France).

== December 7, 1950 (Thursday) ==
- The American cargo ship SS Lane Victory began the evacuation of civilian men, women and children at 5:00 am, shortly after docking at Hungnam in North Korea. According to Captain Albert E. Jarrell of Transport Division Eleven, the Lane Victory had expected that only 1,000 would need to be rescued from Wonsan. When the ship departed at midnight, there were 7,009 aboard, and 20,000 others desperately wanting to get on as well. Police forces had been instructed to screen for "only those persons whom the North Koreans might classify as 'enemy'".
- For the first time, a bridge was dropped from aircraft, as eight American C-119 cargo airplanes deployed sections of a treadway bridge at Koto-ri, and personnel of the Marine Corps Engineer Battalion worked on putting the sections together to rescue troops across the Chosin Reservoir in North Korea. The 31st Infantry Division and the U.S. 1st Marine Division were able to safely evacuate across the frozen reservoir to retreat back toward South Korea. The commander of the 1st Marines, Major General O. P. Smith, would famously tell a United Press reporter, "Retreat, hell! We're just attacking in a different direction."
- Harry Willcock was stopped by police in London and subsequently became the last person in the UK to be prosecuted for refusing to produce an Identity Card.
- Aerolíneas Argentinas, was created as the government-owned national airline for Argentina by order of President Juan Perón, from the forced nationalization and merger of the private Alfa, Zonda, Aeroposta and Fama airlines.

== December 8, 1950 (Friday) ==
- In a private meeting at the White House, President Truman told Britain's Prime Minister Attlee that he would not consider using nuclear weapons in war without consulting the United Kingdom. Attlee asked him to put it in writing, and Truman's response was that "if a man's word was no good, it would not be any better in writing". During a noon break, Secretary of State Dean Acheson and Assistant U.S. Secretary of Defense Robert A. Lovett asked Truman to talk with them privately, and Lovett reminded the President of a written agreement that the two nation's had made on January 7, 1948, canceling Britain's wartime right of veto over America's use of the atom bomb. Truman withdrew the pledge, and records of the meeting were altered to reflect only that Truman had said that it was "his desire to keep the Prime Minister at all times informed of developments."
- American General MacArthur ordered the U.S Army's X Corps to prepare for evacuation from Hungnam, starting on December 11. On the same day, China's General Peng Dehuai, citing the high casualties of the Ninth Army in its fight against the American and South Korean armies, asked Mao Zedong for permission to allow the Chinese Army to recuperate rather than to pursue the retreating invaders. Chairman Mao declined, and ordered Peng to continue across the 38th Parallel in order to take control of South Korea.
- The Mersey ferry, MV Royal Iris, was launched at Dumbarton. Originally painted in a green and cream livery, the ship was distinctive in having a forward dummy funnel near her bridge and two exhaust stacks amidships, on both sides. Onboard amenities would include a dancefloor and stage, tea room, buffet, cocktail bar, and a fish and chip saloon, later earning the ship the nickname "the fish and chip boat".
- Born: Dan Hartman, American singer-songwriter, in West Hanover Township, Pennsylvania (d. 1994)

== December 9, 1950 (Saturday) ==
- West German Chancellor Konrad Adenauer approved the "Schuman Plan", proposed in May by French Foreign Minister Robert Schuman, to place the coal and steel industries of both nations under a unified authority. The plan, joined by other Western European governments, led to the creation of the European Coal and Steel Community. Eventually, unified economic operations would lead to the creation of the European Economic Community (the Common Market) and finally to the European Union.
- Use of the prefrontal lobotomy for psychiatric treatment was ordered prohibited in the Soviet Union by decree of the Ministry of Health. Thousands of such psychosurgical operations on the brain would be performed in the United States and other western nations into the 1970s, and it remains legal, though no longer commonly used.
- The catalytic converter for gasoline combustion engine automobiles was announced by French-born American mechanical engineer Eugene Houdry. At a press conference in Ardmore, Pennsylvania, Houdry explained that "we have found a way to change deadly carbon monoxide into carbon dioxide, and said that "the streets and highways will smell a lot better, and accidental deaths of motorists from carbon monoxide in vehicles should be eliminated."
- President Truman wrote in his journal, "I've had conference after conference on the jittery situation facing the country. I've worked for peace for five years and six months, and it looks like World War III is here. I hope not— but we must meet whatever comes and we will."
- According to sources within the British Foreign Office, in a 1992 discussion with Professor Bruce Cumings of the University of Chicago, General MacArthur requested authorization from President Truman to use atomic weapons in Korea, and submitted a list of targets on Christmas Eve. The requests were rejected and not made public knowledge.
- Greece entered the Korean War, with the arrival of the 849-member Greek Expeditionary Force. The units would serve with various cavalry and infantry regiments of the United States Army.
- An 8.2 magnitude earthquake occurred in the Atacama Desert of Chile near Calama and killed one person.
- Born: Joan Armatrading, British singer-songwriter; in Basseterre, Saint Kitts

== December 10, 1950 (Sunday) ==
- Bertrand Russell won the Nobel Prize in Literature "in recognition of his varied and significant writings in which he champions humanitarian ideals and freedom of thought".
- Cecil Frank Powell won the Nobel Prize in Physics "for his development of the photographic method of studying nuclear processes and his discoveries regarding mesons made with this method".
- Ralph Bunche of the United States received the Nobel Peace Prize for his work in negotiating the peace agreements between Israel and its neighbors that ended the 1948 Arab–Israeli War. In his presentation speech, Nobel Committee Chairman Gunnar Jahn said, "Ralph Bunche, you have said yourself that you are an incurable optimist. You said that you were convinced that the mediation in Palestine would be successful... May you succeed in bringing victory to the ideals of peace, the foundation upon which we must build the future of mankind."
- American biochemist Edward C. Kendall, Polish-born chemist Tadeusz Reichstein, and American physician Philip Hench were jointly awarded the Nobel Prize for Physiology or Medicine for their discoveries of that led to the isolation of the hormone cortisone.
- American author William Faulkner spoke at Stockholm to receive the Nobel Prize in Literature that had been awarded to him the year before. He gave "what has been hailed as one of the finest Nobel acceptance speeches ever given". "Our tragedy today is a general and universal physical fear so long sustained by now that can even bear it. There are no longer problems of the spirit. There is only one question: When will I be blown up?". But, he added, "I believe that man will not merely endure: He will prevail. He is immortal, not because he alone among creatures has an inexhaustible voice, but because he has a soul, a spirit capable of compassion and sacrifice and endurance."
- After being trapped behind enemy lines for two weeks, the 1st Division Marines, 20,000 American troops and British Commandos were finally able to break through Chinese forces that had held them at the Hagaru region. The Army soldiers and Marines pushed through narrow mountain roads, in temperatures that dropped to -25 °F (-32 °C). At 2:40 a.m. local time, they linked up with the U.S. Army Third Division rescue force, then made the remaining 39 mile escape drive to Hungnam for evacuation.
- B-29s bombed Mirim airfield in Korea with high-explosive bombs, five days after UN forces abandoned the base and evacuated Pyongyang.

== December 11, 1950 (Monday) ==
- The Hungnam evacuation started and continued for fifteen days, allowing 105,000 troops (mostly from the U.S. X Army Corps and the South Korean 1st Army Corps) to be evacuated from North Korea, along with 91,000 civilians. All serviceable equipment was taken out, including 17,500 vehicles and 350,000 tons of cargo. The evacuees from Hungnam harbor were protected by U.S. Navy air support from seven aircraft carriers, and by shelling from 13 ships. Fortunately, China and North Korea did not seriously interfere with the process, which would end on December 26.
- The Maria Hertogh riots broke out in Singapore when Muslims protested the return of a 13-year-old girl to her parents in her native land of the Netherlands. Maria's parents, both of the Roman Catholic faith, had been imprisoned by Japanese occupying forces during World War II; Maria was raised by Che Aminah and Mansoor Adabi, a Muslim couple in Bandung in the Dutch East Indies (now Indonesia). After the Hertoghs located their daughter, now renamed Nadra, Adeline Hertogh went to court in Singapore and was awarded custody on December 2 (and annulled her betrothal to a Muslim schoolteacher) as the British colonial court in Singapore applied Netherlands law. The case of the "Dutch jungle girl" made headlines worldwide. Singapore's Muslim community sided with Che and Aminah, who had fought to keep Maria. From December 3 to December 7, English and Malay language newspapers inflamed the situation by publishing photographs of Maria at the Christian Convent of the Good Shepherd. In three days of rioting, 18 people were killed, 173 injured and more than 500 arrested. Maria and her mother were flown to the Netherlands on December 12.
- For the first time, the United States Atomic Energy Commission established rules for the maximum measurable level of exposure to radiation.
- The parliament of South Korea passed the National Defense Forces Act, requiring all males between the ages of 17 and 40 to enlist and train as reserve military personnel. Soldiers, police and government officials were exempt from the requirement.
- North Korea's Kim Il Sung was fired from his post as Vice-Minister of Defense, after having been criticized by his fellow Communists as having failed to order enough air power to prevent the seizure of the nation by United Nations forces. As a result, General Kim Chaek was given the honor of addressing the rally to welcome North Korean soldiers back to Pyongyang. Dae-Sook Suh, Kim Il Sung: The North Korean Leader (Columbia University Press, 1988) p358
- Died: Leslie Comrie, 57, New Zealand astronomer and computing pioneer, died of a stroke

== December 12, 1950 (Tuesday) ==
- The National Science Board, chosen by the President and confirmed by the U.S. Senate, held its first meeting as the National Science Foundation began operations.
- Paula Ackerman became the first woman in the United States to serve a congregation as a Rabbi. Her husband, Rabbi William Ackerman, had led the Temple Beth Israel in Meridian, Mississippi, but had died. Mrs. Ackerman, acting under the authority of a ruling in Reform Judaism, became the "interim spiritual leader", and was granted authority by the state of Mississippi to conduct marriages.
- The BBC began broadcasting its first television adaptation of Little Women, starring future broadcaster David Jacobs as Laurie. No recording of the series was made.
- Announcing an early version of sending printed materials to subscribers electronically, RCA Laboratories unveiled what it called "the first atomic facsimile library". The press release noted that it would give scientists "quick access to any scientific information anywhere that telephone lines can reach". The collection of nuclear science information was located at Oak Ridge, Tennessee. RCA reported that the first test of what is now referred to as "faxing" a document was when a scientist at the Y-12 electromagnetic separation plant needed a two-page report from the library and that "He had it complete in four and a half minutes."
- Born: Rajinikanth, Indian film idol and winner of six Best Actor awards from the Tamil Nadu State Film Awards, as Shivaji Rao Gaekwad in Bangalore
- Died: Peter Fraser, 66, the 24th Prime Minister of New Zealand from 1940 to 1949, and Leader of the Opposition after the defeat of the New Zealand Labour Party in the 1949 elections.

== December 13, 1950 (Wednesday) ==
- The Battle of Chosin Reservoir ended inconclusively, with Chinese forces recapturing most of North Korea but the United Nations securing their position in South Korea.
- Zhou Enlai, the Prime Minister of the People's Republic of China, replied to a confidential telegram sent two days earlier by Wu Xiuquan and Qiao Guanhua, who had appeared for an invitation by the United Nations Security Council to discuss an end to the Korean War. Zhou responded with a summary of his discussion the day before with India's Ambassador to China, K. M. Panikkar who had been a conduit for messages between China and the United States. "It is good that the Indian government is making great efforts for peace," he said, "however, it has not been entrusted by either America or the UN.... We are eager to know the whole opinion of the USA and the UN regarding conditions for an armistice." However, he added, "As to the 38th Parallel issue, it has long since been violated by the American invading armies and MacArthur, and is no longer in existence." The telegram would be made public decades later.
- Britain's Food Minister, Maurice Webb, announced a more than one-half reduction in the meat ration for its citizens, effective December 31. The new limit would go from 26 pence of fresh meat and corned beef per week, per person, to 12 pence, because of the halt of meat shipments by Argentina earlier in the year. The Associated Press noted that the ration would allow a family of four to buy one-pound of beefsteak per week, but that "cheaper cuts of beef, lamb or mutton could stretch that allowance slightly".
- U.S. Senator Joseph McCarthy of Wisconsin and one of his strongest critics, newspaper columnist Drew Pearson, got into a fistfight when the two encountered each other at the Sulgrave Club in Washington D.C.. McCarthy, known for his hunt for Communists and sympathizers in the United States, had made comments in the Senate that he would "take the hide off" Pearson when they next met; the senator said that Pearson had approached him and said "You get rough and I'll get you, McCarthy." In response, McCarthy said, "I smacked him with my open hand and knocked him down on his hips." Pearson's version was that "The senator kicked me twice in the groin. As usual, he hit below the belt."
- Born:
  - Roch Wamytan, New Caledonia politician, President of the Congress of New Caledonia
  - Wendie Malick, American television actress (Hot in Cleveland, Just Shoot Me!), in Buffalo, New York
- Died: Abraham Wald, 48, statistician and mathematician. Professor Wald and his wife, on his lecture tour of India, were en route from Madras to Trivandrum when their airplane crashed.

== December 14, 1950 (Thursday) ==
- The office of the United Nations High Commissioner for Refugees (UNHCR) was created by vote of the UN General Assembly's Resolution 428 (V).
- Inventor Wayne M. Pierce, Jr. applied for a patent for the first snowmaking machine, the "snow gun", based on the discovery by Canadian scientist Ray Ringer, that artificial snowflakes could be created by blowing compressed water vapor through freezing air. U.S. Patent No. 2,676,471 would be granted to them on April 27, 1954. The three Americans had been inspired in 1948 after a winter without snow had severely decreased sales in their ski shop.
- Georg August Zinn became Minister-President of Hesse; he remained in post until 1969.

== December 15, 1950 (Friday) ==
- U.S. President Truman addressed the nation on radio at 10:30 pm from the White House, and announced that he would proclaim a national emergency. "Our homes, our nation, all the things we believe in are in great danger," he said. "This danger has been created by the rulers of the Soviet Union." He added, "The future of civilization depends on what we do— on what we do now, and in the months ahead." Near the end of his address, After outlining what needed to be done, he told listeners, "Because of all these things I have been talking about with you, I will issue a proclamation tomorrow morning declaring that a national emergency exists."
- The Customs Cooperation Council was established under a convention signed at Brussels. It would come into effect on November 4, 1952, and would later be renamed the World Customs Organization.
- The Hungnam evacuation began as United Nations forces and North Korean citizens began evacuating from the port of Hungnam in North Korea.
- The Stampede Corral sports stadium in Calgary, Canada, was officially opened.
- The CBS radio program Hear It Now premiered on 173 CBS affiliates. Hosted by journalist Edward R. Murrow, the program would last for six months before being canceled so that Murrow could do the news show on television, under the title See It Now.
- Died: Vallabhbhai Patel, 75, Deputy Prime Minister of India since its independence in 1947.

== December 16, 1950 (Saturday) ==
- At 10:20 a.m., President Truman signed Presidential Proclamation 2914, that included the statement "Whereas world conquest by communist imperialism is the goal of the forces of aggression that have been loosed upon the world; and Whereas, if the goal of communist imperialism were to be achieved, the people of this country would no longer enjoy the full and rich life they have with God's help built for themselves and their children..." among the reasons for proclaiming "the existence of a national emergency, which requires that the military, naval, air, and civilian defenses of this country be strengthened as speedily as possible...". In pursuit of those purposes, the Office of Defense Mobilization was established. Truman's order, along with three other presidential proclamations of an emergency (on March 6, 1933; March 23, 1970; and August 15, 1971) would not be rescinded until the enactment of the "National Emergencies Act", which would become effective on September 14, 1978.
- The United States State Department froze all assets held in America by residents of China and embargoed all trade with China and North Korea. China would freeze all American assets on December 28.
- East Germany enacted its "Law on Defense of Peace", directing that "Whoever slanders other peoples and races, incites against them, and demands their boycott in order to disturb peaceful relations between them to involve the German people in a new war, shall be punished by imprisonment or, in grave cases, by imprisonment at hard labor," effectively criminalizing any dissent against the government that might be considered to be defamation. Similar "defense of peace" laws would soon be passed in Albania, Bulgaria, Czechoslovakia, Hungary, Poland and Romania. Socialist Unity Party Chairman Walter Ulbricht announced the same day that the membership cards of all 1.2 million Party members were revoked and that no new ones would be issued until completion of a purging of anyone found to be inappropriate following an investigation.

== December 17, 1950 (Sunday) ==
- Lieutenant Colonel Bruce Hinton shot down a Soviet MiG-15 fighter while flying one of four F-86 Sabre jets that the United States Air Force was using in combat for the first time, going up against four MiGs in a battle involving eight jet fighters. The downed MiG-15 was piloted by Major Yakov Efromeenko, who ejected safely before his plane crashed. F-86 pilots would shoot down another 791 Soviet-built fighters during the war.
- General Jean de Lattre de Tassigny arrived in Saigon (now Ho Chi Minh City) to serve as the new High Commissioner of French Indochina. A strict disciplinarian, de Lattre would be able to temporarily halt the Viet Minh guerillas from taking Hanoi during 1951, but would serve for only a year, being forced to return to France on January 11, 1952, after being diagnosed with terminal cancer. He would die four months later, on May 8, 1952.
- Yonpo Airfield, located three miles from Hungnam and within range of Chinese and North Korean guns, was abandoned by the United Nations after completing the aerial evacuation of personnel there. Evacuation by sea from Hungnam Harbor would continue for another week. By the time the UN forces withdrew from Yonpo, however, U.S. Army engineers and construction battalions had built a new airfield closer to the shoreline. The clearing of jungle, and the creation of a suitable landing strip, had been accomplished in only four days.

== December 18, 1950 (Monday) ==
- The Bengal Central Bank merged with three other banks to form the United Bank of India.
- President Truman ordered the establishment of the Nevada Proving Ground so that nuclear weapons testing could be performed within the continental United States, and the American stockpile of atomic bombs and hydrogen bombs could be rapidly increased during the national emergency. There were five proposed locations, all of them federally owned, and the other four choices were at White Sands in New Mexico; Dugway Proving Ground in Utah; a fifty-mile strip of land between Fallon and Eureka, Nevada; or Pamlico Sound near Camp Lejeune in North Carolina. Three days later, the Atomic Energy Commission would lease a 350 square mile portion of the U.S. Air Force's Tonopah Bombing and Gunnery Range in Nye County, Nevada, 65 miles away from Las Vegas. The ground, renamed the Nevada Test Site, would be added to over the years. The desert site itself was relatively unpopulated, 25 miles away from the towns of Indian Springs and Cactus Springs. Six weeks after the selection, an atomic bomb would be detonated at Frenchman Flat on January 27, 1951.
- Born: Leonard Maltin, American film critic and historian, in New York City

== December 19, 1950 (Tuesday) ==
- General Dwight D. Eisenhower, retired from the United States Army, was brought back into service by President Truman to serve as the first Supreme Allied Commander of Europe (SACEUR). The announcement was made on the same day that the NATO nations accepted the Pleven Plan, proposed by French Prime Minister Rene Pleven, for the gradual rearmament of Germany and its integration into the defense of Western Europe. Eisenhower had been serving as President of Columbia University after returning to civilian life.
- In Albania, the city of Kuçovë was renamed "Stalin City" (Qyteti Stalin) as a tribute to the 71st birthday of Soviet leader Joseph Stalin. After the nation made its transition from a Communist regime to a multiparty state in 1992, the city returned to its former name.
- The 101st Aviation Regiment of the United States Army was activated in Korea.

== December 20, 1950 (Wednesday) ==
- George Borg Olivier was sworn in as the new Prime Minister of Malta (and leader of Maltase Nationalist Party) after the death of Enrico Mizzi.
- Czechoslovakia became the second Communist nation to enact a "defense of peace" law to suppress dissent, in an act similar to that of East Germany. The "Act on Protection of Peace" made it a "criminal act against peace" for any person who attempted "to disturb the peaceful communion of nations" by "supporting war propaganda"
- Communist forces in China began an eradication campaign against Nationalist Chinese guerrillas as the 460th Regiment and the Independent Regiment of the communist Yulin Military Sub-district and the 135th Division drove out bandits in Guangxi Province.
- Sunset Boulevard was named Best Film at the 22nd National Board of Review Awards.
- By a vote of 247–1, the U.S. House of Representatives passed the Federal Civil Defense Act of 1950, providing three billion dollars of funding for fallout shelters nationwide and for other preparations for a nuclear war. The lone dissenting vote was from Michigan Congressman Clare Hoffman.
- Died: Enrico Mizzi, 65, Prime Minister of Malta since September 26

== December 21, 1950 (Thursday) ==
- General Douglas MacArthur ordered the censorship of all news reports concerning the Korean War, with his office to provide official clearance before news reports, magazine articles, photographs and films, or broadcasts could be released to the world press. Prohibited news included any criticism of the American and United Nations soldiers and commanders, or their handling of the war, and all correspondents were put under the jurisdiction of the United States Army, with punishments for violation of the order ranging from suspension of privileges, to trial by court martial. United Press reporter Peter Webb was one of the first to be punished, after failing to clear a report about the death of General Walker with MacArthur's headquarters; he was detained for 18 hours before being released. The Daily Dispatch of London would comment that the only thing that could officially be said about the United Nations troops was that they were in Korea.
- For the first time, the United States Civil Aeronautics Board approved licensing for a flying car, giving its certificate of approval for the "Airphibian", invented by Robert E. Fulton, Jr. Like all other automobile airplanes that had sought a blessing from the CAB, the Airphibian had detachable wings. Fulton flew into Washington's National Airport, removed the wings, then, drove to offices of the Civil Aeronautics Administration, where he accepted the certification from administrator Donald W. Nyrop.
- The gold town of Allanridge was established in the Free State Province of South Africa.
- One of the most well-known articles of clothing in comic strips was introduced, when Charlie Brown was first seen in his "zig-zag T-shirt". Cartoonist Charles M. Schulz had added the distinction in order to set Charlie Brown apart from the rest of the strip's characters.
- The comedy-drama film Harvey starring James Stewart and Josephine Hull was released in the United States.
- Born: Nikos Kotzias, Foreign Minister of Greece from 2015 to 2018; in Athens
- Died:
  - Hattie Carraway, 72, first woman to win a general election for the United States Senate. After being appointed in 1931 to fill a vacancy caused by the death of her late husband, U.S. Senator Thaddeus H. Caraway for Arkansas, Mrs. Carraway won in a special election to serve the remainder of his term, then ran in for re-election in 1932, and served for two full terms before losing in the 1944 Democratic primary to J. William Fulbright
  - Cardinal Konrad von Preysing, 70, Archbishop of Berlin in Nazi Germany and an opponent of the regime of Adolf Hitler; after the end of World War II, he was elevated to the rank of a Roman Catholic cardinal in 1946.

== December 22, 1950 (Friday) ==
- Captain Leonard LaRue, of the U.S. Merchant Marine ship SS Meredith Victory, oversaw the largest sea rescue in history at Hungnam Harbor in North Korea. Chinese and North Korean troops were approaching the port city, and thousands of Korean civilians were desperately trying to escape. U.S. servicemen had already successfully departed. After some U.S. Army officers asked Captain LaRue if he would be willing to take Koreans aboard, LaRue—who was under no military obligation—said that he would take as many people as the ship could hold, and emptied most of his cargo in order to create maximum space. With U.S. Marine Colonel Edward Forney coordinating an orderly departure, the Meredith Victory took on 14,000 men, women and children in an area designed for about 60 people. In below zero weather, the ship took on its human cargo overnight, then started a 28-hour journey to Pusan, unescorted, past mines. Remarkably, none of the passengers died during the voyage, and five more were born during the trip.
- The People's Republic of China rejected the first ceasefire resolution that had been drafted by the United Nations. A truce would not be signed until two and a half years later, on July 27, 1953.
- Napalm was used for the first time in war in Vietnam, when High Commissioner de Lattre ordered the French Air Force to bomb a concentrated group of Viet Minh guerillas in the Tiên Yên District. Over the next several decades, the highly flammable petroleum compound of napalm would burn thousands of Vietnamese people to death.
- The United States, United Kingdom and France rejected the October 21, 1950, proposal by the Soviet Union for a reunification between West Germany and East Germany.

== December 23, 1950 (Saturday) ==
- Pope Pius XII gave his annual Christmas radio broadcast and told listeners around the world about the discovery of the tomb of Saint Peter. Speaking in Italian, with translations being given worldwide, Pius said "È stata trovata la tomba del Principe degli Apostoli." ("The tomb of the Prince of the Apostles has been found."). Though not disclosing when it had happened, the Pope said that the tomb had been found at St. Peter's Basilica and that "The gigantic cupola rises in an arch exactly above the sepulcher of the first Bishop of Rome— a sepulcher most humble in origin but on which the veneration of later centuries erected, with a wonderful succession of achievements, the greatest temple of Christianity." He added that human bones had been found in the tomb as well, but that it was impossible to prove that those were the remains of Peter. Peter, the apostle of whom Jesus Christ said, "On this rock I will build my church" (Matthew 16:18), and considered by Roman Catholic believers to have been the first Pope, had been crucified and buried on a hill in Rome in AD 64, near the present day Vatican City,
- The United States made its first commitment to aiding a war in Southeast Asia when it joined France, Vietnam, Cambodia and Laos in signing what is referred to as the pentaleral agreement. The U.S. would support France's war against the Viet Minh guerillas by loaning 1.2 billion dollars' worth of tanks, aircraft, and small arms and ammunition for four years. Under the agreement, the title to the equipment was to revert to the United States "at the conclusion of hostilities". After France departed from Vietnam in 1954, the United States would use the goal of recovery of the materials as "a convenient pretext to place more American personnel in Vietnam".
- For the first time, an American ship was struck by shells fired from the guns of a North Korean shore battery, as the destroyer USS Charles S. Sperry was hit back by the enemy.
- All 15 of the passengers on board Canadian Pacific Air Lines Flight 4 were rescued alive, a day after the Douglas DC-3 airplane they had been on had crashed into Okanagan Mountain during a winter storm. Two of the three crew members were killed. The travelers had been on their way from Vancouver to Calgary for the Christmas holidays.
- The first section of the Johnsonville–Porirua Motorway in New Zealand was opened.
- Born: Vicente del Bosque, manager of Real Madrid C.F. from 1999 to 2003, and the Spain national football team from 2008 to 2016; in Salamanca
- Died: Lieutenant General Walton H. Walker, 61, the commander of the Eighth United States Army in Korea, was killed in a motor vehicle accident when the jeep he was riding in overturned. At about 10:00 am, Walker was on his way to present a citation to Britain's 27th Commonwealth Brigade. According to witnesses, an American weapons carrier was passing the rest of a United Nations convoy, and the driver of Walker's jeep swerved to avoid a crash. The jeep struck a telephone pole, overturned twice, and landed upright. Walker was dead on arrival at a field hospital.

== December 24, 1950 (Sunday) ==
- At 2:36 pm local time, the remaining members of the U.S. First Marine Division and the South Korean Third Army Corps departed on the last American ship out of Hungnam, bringing an end to the safe evacuation of 105,000 American, British and South Korean soldiers from North Korea. By noon, only 3,000 men from the 3rd Division remained at the shore. The final group of 200 marched to the docks, answered the roll call, and boarded three amphibious tracking boats referred to as "amtracs" in order to reach the transport ships that remained at anchor. U.S. Navy demolition teams had planted explosive charges on the docks, and as the ships sailed away, the bombs were detonated and destroyed the waterfront. The announcement of the successful operation was made by Major General Edward Almond, after the final evacuees were safely at sea.
- In their first year in the National Football League after four seasons as champions of the defunct All-America Football Conference, the Cleveland Browns won the 1950 NFL Championship Game, 30–28, over the Los Angeles Rams, with a field goal in the final minute of the game.
- According to sources within the British Foreign Office, General MacArthur followed up a December 9 request to use the atomic bomb in Korea, by compiling "a list of retardation targets" that was submitted to President Truman. MacArthur contemplated that he would need four bombs to use on "invasion forces", four more against "critical concentrations of enemy air power", and another 26 for his pre-selected targets. Reporter Bruce Cumings would disclose his findings 42 years later in The Bulletin of the Atomic Scientists.

== December 25, 1950 (Monday) ==
- The Stone of Scone, the traditional coronation stone of Scottish monarchs, English monarchs and, more recently, British monarchs, was stolen from London's Westminster Abbey by a group of four Scottish students. Ian Hamilton, Kay Matheson, Alan Stuart and Gavin Vernon sneaked into the Abbey on Christmas Day. They dropped the famous Stone after prying it out from beneath the coronation chair, accidentally breaking it into two pieces, before driving back to Scotland. They would return the Stone after three months, on April 11, 1951, placing it in Arbroath Abbey on the altar above the grave of King William the Lion of Scotland. None of the four were ever charged with a crime, and Hamilton would sell his story, "How We Stole the Stone of Scone", to LIFE Magazine.
- Trial was held for the three leaders of the Armata Neagră, a group of fifty Moldovan nationalist rebels who had waged a campaign against the Moldavian Soviet Socialist Republic within the Soviet Union. The Odessa Military Tribunal conducted a closed-door hearing in Kishinev (now Chișinău, Moldova, and sentenced Teodor Coşcodan, Ion Coşcodan and Ion Borş to be shot for treason, and the sentences were carried out shortly thereafter.
- Born:
  - Peter Boardman, English mountaineer, in Stockport, Cheshire, England (d. 1982 on Mount Everest)
  - Ed Hochuli, American NFL referee and trial lawyer; in Milwaukee
  - Manny Trillo, Venezuelan-born Major League Baseball player and four time All-Star, in Caripito

== December 26, 1950 (Tuesday) ==
- The new Headquarters of the United Nations building opened at 760 East 42nd Street in New York (now 760 United Nations Plaza). Secretary General Trygve Lie and most of his staff of 3,000 employees had previously been working at quarters leased from the Sperry Gyroscope Company at 1111 Marcus Avenue in Lake Success, New York.
- Lieutenant General Matthew Ridgway arrived in South Korea as the new commander of the Eighth U.S. Army, replacing General Walton Walker, who had died three days earlier. Ridgway had been called to duty a few hours after Walker's death, and flew almost immediately to Tokyo to report to General MacArthur.
- Troops of the Chinese People's Volunteer Army crossed the 38th Parallel, aiding North Korea's second invasion of South Korea. By then, thousands of South Korean men, women and children were fleeing Seoul.
- Outgoing Major League Baseball Commissioner Albert "Happy" Chandler announced an unprecedented deal of six million dollars from Mutual Broadcasting Company and the Gillette company for television rights to the World series.
- A fire at Prahran Market in Melbourne, Australia, destroyed part of the building.
- The comedy-drama film Born Yesterday starring Judy Holliday (in an Oscar-winning performance), William Holden and Broderick Crawford was released.
- Died: James Stephens, 70, Irish novelist and poet

== December 27, 1950 (Wednesday) ==
- The United States began designating large areas of airspace over the Atlantic and Pacific Oceans and the Gulf of Mexico with the classification Air Defense Identification Zone (ADIZ) for any place "within which the ready identification, location, and control of aircraft is required in the interest of national security". From then on, all domestic and foreign flights would be required to file flight plans. Any incoming foreign aircraft was required to give their position to controllers when aircraft were "not less than one hour cruising distance via the most direct route, from the United States". Thus, the Atlantic ADIZ could range from 300 miles to 600 miles from U.S. territory.
- The agreed upon date for the Netherlands to turn over control of West Irian to Indonesia passed, without any action by the Dutch authorities, causing a conflict between Indonesia's President Sukarno and Prime Minister Mohammad Natsir over who had the authority to make decisions. Both men agreed that the Netherlands-Indonesia Union should be dissolved, but the President wanted to do it unilaterally, while the Prime Minister favored negotiations with the Netherlands, and was backed by a 12–3 vote of the cabinet ministers. The disagreement between Sukarno and Natsir would be resolved in 1951 by the latter's resignation. The western half of the island of New Guinea would continue to be administered by the Dutch as Netherlands New Guinea until its handover to Indonesia in 1962–63, and is now the provinces of Papua and West Papua.
- The Editura Militară publishing house was established as a state-run company in Communist Romania.
- Born: Terry Bozzio, American drummer, in San Francisco, California
- Died: Max Beckmann, 66, German artist who championed the "New Objectivity" school of post-expressionism in artistry.

== December 28, 1950 (Thursday) ==
- In England, the Peak District was the first applicant under the National Parks and Access to the Countryside Act 1949 for protection as a national park, with the filing of the proper orders with the United Kingdom's Minister of Town and Country Planning. Inaugurated on April 17, 1951, the Peak District National Park encompasses 555 square miles of land at the southern end of the Pennine Mountains and is primarily located in Derbyshire.
- Twelve days after the United States had frozen Chinese assets within U.S. borders, all American assets within the People's Republic of China were decreed to be under Chinese control, and American funds would no longer be accepted within the nation. In that most of the funds being sent had gone to support Christian colleges that had been established by missionaries, China also decreed that it would guarantee "spiritual and material support" to the institutions, making the institutions dependent on Communist support and subject to regulation from Beijing.
- For the first time during the Korean War, American troops were fighting Chinese soldiers on the South Korean side of the 38th Parallel. The encounter was with a Chinese patrol two miles south of the Parallel, at Kaesong. American patrols reported an even further penetration, with at least 500 Chinese troops 17 miles inland, and an estimated 500,000 members of the Chinese Volunteer Army were massed at the border for an invasion.
- China's People's Liberation Army Air Force pilots entered the Korean War for the first time, supplementing the more experienced Soviet pilots who had been operating in North Korea for several months.
- Born: Alex Chilton, American musician and lead singer of The Box Tops and Big Star, in Memphis, Tennessee (d. 2010)
- Died: Warren Wright, Sr., 75, American horse breeder who had owned Kentucky Derby winners, including U.S. Triple Crown winners Whirlaway and Citation

== December 29, 1950 (Friday) ==
- The Rose Tattoo, authored by Tennessee Williams, was performed for the first time, opening at the Erlanger Theatre in Chicago before its Broadway opening on February 3, 1951, at the Martin Beck Theatre. Although the production got an unenthusiastic reception from critics when it opened, it would receive the 1951 Tony Award for best play.
- President Truman signed the Yugoslav Emergency Relief Assistance Act of 1950 into law, providing $38,000,000 of aid to remedy a food shortage and to avert a famine in Yugoslavia. "In this way, we can help preserve the independence of a nation which is defying the savage threats of the Soviet imperialists," he told Congress, "and keeping Soviet power out of one of Europe's most strategic areas. This is clearly in our national interest."
- Admiral Carlos Torres accepted the transfer of USS Brooklyn and USS Nashville to the Chilean Navy under the Mutual Defense Assistance Act.
- A Central Intelligence Agency (CIA) report to the President and the Joint Chiefs of Staff concluded that France would not be able to maintain its fight in Vietnam, and that the French would have to leave by September. At the time, the Vietnam war was taking 37 percent of the French budget.

== December 30, 1950 (Saturday) ==
- After the Joint Chiefs of Staff had instructed him not to take the offensive in Korea, General MacArthur made a four-point counter-proposal to take the war to the People's Republic of China. He requested authority to "(1) blockade the coast of China; (2) destroy, through naval gunfire and air bombardment, China's industrial capacity to wage war; (3) secure reinforcements from the Nationalist garrison on Formosa [Taiwan] to strengthen our position in Korea if we decide to continue the fight for that peninsula; and (4) release existing restrictions on the Formosan garrison for diversionary action, possibly leading to counter invasions against vulnerable areas of the Chinese mainland." The Chiefs rejected the suggestions as unreasonable, and began to bypass MacArthur's command by sending orders directly to his subordinates.
- After a successful run on Los Angeles station KECA-TV, Space Patrol made its national television debut, on the ABC television network. The setting of the half-hour-long science fiction adventure series was 1,000 years in the future, in the year 2950 of the 30th Century, with Commander Buzz Corry and his sidekick, Cadet Happy, flying for the United Planets Space Patrol. The maiden episode was "Treachery on Mars". Live telecasts were made in Los Angeles at 6:00 pm Pacific time, and kinescope recordings were sent to other ABC affiliates.
- At 11:20 in the morning, a Royal Australian Air Force CAC Wirraway crashed into a crowded beach at Maroochydore in Queensland, Australia, killing three children and seriously injuring 14 other people on the beach. The Wirraway airplane had been conducting a patrol for sharks and was flying only 30 feet off the ground when its engine stalled. At the time, there were an estimated 700 people on the beach, and another 700 in the water. After a wingtip hit the ground, the plane cartwheeled through a group of 40 people. The two-man crew survived the crash, although the pilot's right leg was amputated.
- Over the Sierra Nevada desert, near Bishop, California, William S. Ivans, Jr. shattered the record for highest altitude achieved in a glider. The Fédération Aéronautique Internationale (FAI) had recognized a 33,500 feet height reached by Jack Robinson earlier in the year. Ivans and his unpowered Schweitzer 1-23 aircraft were released from a B-13 bomber at 12,000 feet, and he soared a record 30,100 feet to more than eight miles altitude, topping off at 42,100 feet, as verified by inspection of a sealed barograph. He would be awarded the FAI's Lilienthal Prize for 1950.
- The comedy film At War with the Army starring the team of Martin and Lewis (in their first starring feature) premiered in San Francisco.
- "The Tennessee Waltz" by Patti Page topped the Billboard Best Sellers in Stores chart.
- Died: Mihail Manoilescu, 59, Romanian fascist and journalist, in Sighet Prison

== December 31, 1950 (Sunday) ==
- Seoul was invaded for the third time in seven months as the Chinese 13th Army attacked the Republic of Korea Army's 1st, 2nd, 5th and 6th Infantry Divisions along the 38th parallel, breaching United Nations Forces' defenses at the Imjin River, Hantan River, Gapyeong and Chuncheon in the process. China's "Third Phase Offensive" began at dusk on New Year's Eve, and would reach Seoul by January 4. The First Phase had been halting the advance of UN Troops toward China, and the Second Phase had been the retaking of North Korea.
- A proposed new national anthem for West Germany, Hymne an Deutschland (Hymn to Germany), was performed for the first time, played nationwide on the radio following a New Year's Eve message by President Theodor Heuss. Written by Rudolf Alexander Schroeder, and set to music by Hermann Reuter, the Hymne was not embraced by the public, and the traditional Deutschlandlied (without its "Deutschland, Deutschland über alles" stanza) would be reaffirmed as the nation's national anthem.
- Died:
  - Karl Renner, 80, President of Austria since 1945, and the Head of State of the Second Austrian Republic after World War II
  - Charles Koechlin, 83, French classical music composer
