= November 1950 =

Month of 1950

<<	November 1950					>>
Su	Mo	Tu	We	Th	Fr	Sa
			1	2	3	4
5	6	7	8	9	10	11
12	13	14	15	16	17	18
19	20	21	22	23	24	25
26	27	28	29	30

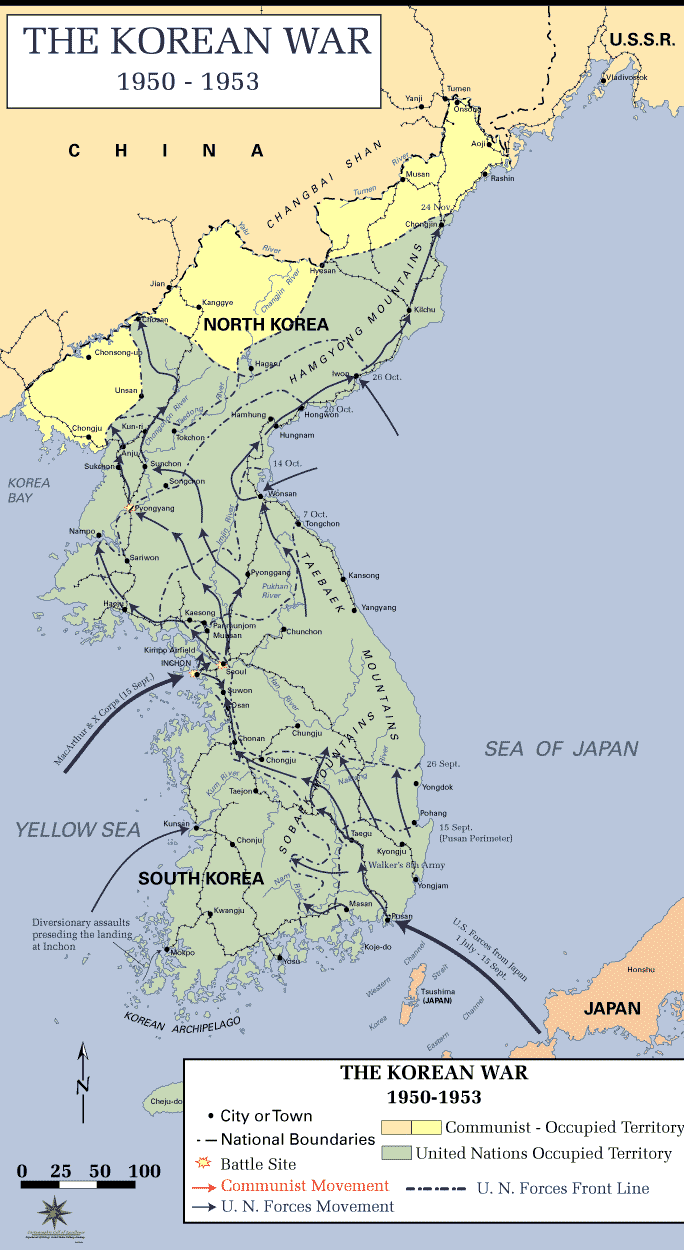
November 24, 1950: U.S. General MacArthur begins "Home By Christmas" offensive to complete UN control of Korea

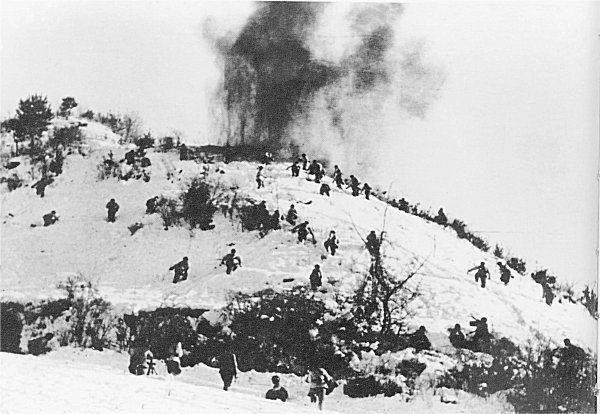
November 27, 1950: Communist Chinese troops launch massive counterattack against United Nations and U.S. troops in Korea

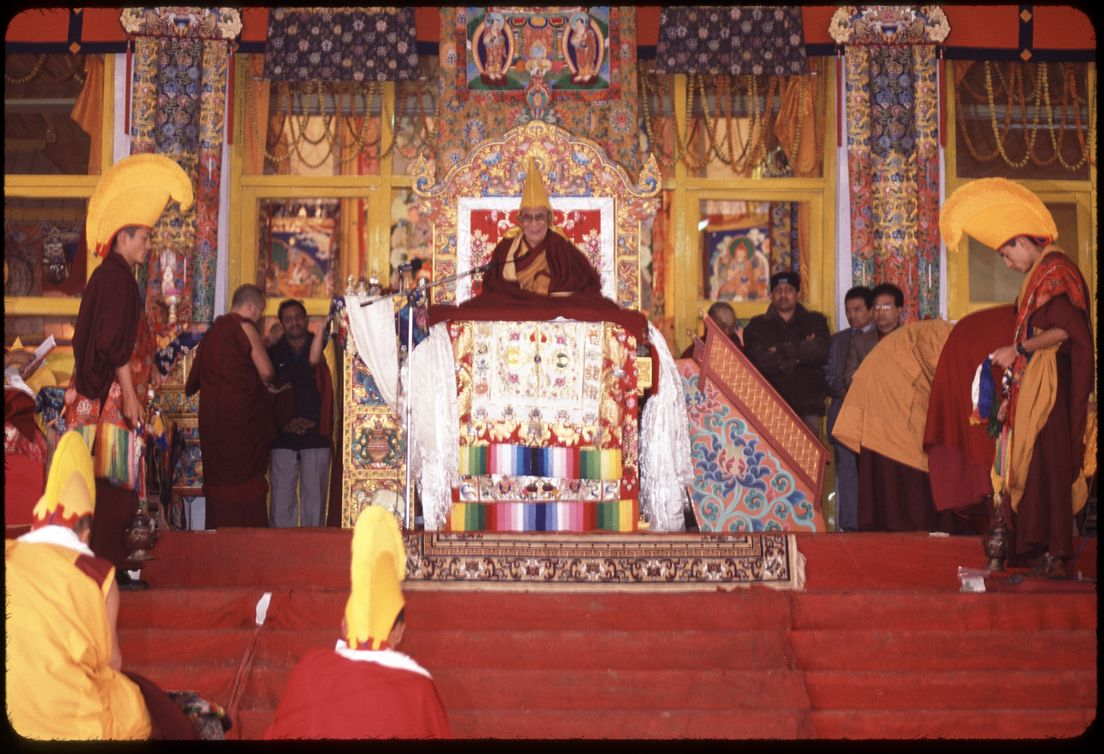
November 17, 1950: U.S. The 14th Dalai Lama is enthroned

The following events occurred in November 1950:

== November 1, 1950 (Wednesday) ==
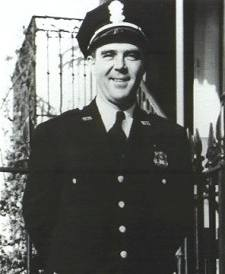
Officer Coffelt

- Two Puerto Rican nationalists attempted to assassinate the U.S. president, Harry S. Truman. At 2:15 p.m., Griselio Torresola and Oscar Collazo, aware that President Truman was staying at the Blair House while the White House was undergoing repairs, attacked the residence at 1651 Pennsylvania Avenue N.W. in Washington, DC. Collazo tried to break in through the front door, and shot U.S. Capitol police officer Donald Birdzell in the knee, but was wounded by three other Secret Service agents. Torresola fired multiple shots at White House police officer Leslie Coffelt and mortally wounded him, but Coffelt returned fire and killed Torresola instantly. Coffelt died several hours later. Collazo would be sentenced to death, but Truman would commute his sentence to life imprisonment. On September 6, 1979, Collazo would be released after his sentence was altered to time served by U.S. president Jimmy Carter, and died on February 21, 1994.
- After having witnessed the "Miracle of the Sun" Pope Pius XII defined a new dogma of Roman Catholicism, the Munificentissimus Deus, which says that God took Mary's body into Heaven after her death (the "Assumption of the Blessed Virgin Mary").
- An American flight of P-51 Mustang fighters and T-6 Mosquito trainer aircraft, all propeller-driven aircraft, was patrolling the skies over North Korea when they encountered six Chinese MiG-15 jet fighters. The U.S. planes managed to evade the jets and return to base, but the event marked a change in the air war in Korea.
- Born: Robert B. Laughlin, American physicist, 1988 Nobel Prize in Physics laureate, in Visalia, California

== November 2, 1950 (Thursday) ==
- Japan's Hokuriku, or "Blue Train", came into service between Ueno and Osaka via Kanazawa. The journey from Ueno to Osaka took 18 hours 45 minutes.
- King Ibn Saud of Saudi Arabia issued a royal decree, putting a tax of 20% of net profits on all corporations from their operations within the Kingdom. This would be followed by an additional tax decreed on December 27.
- U.S. Army Corporal Henry D. Connell, a 17-year-old from Springfield, Massachusetts, disappeared along with 380 soldiers from the 3rd Battalion of the 8th Cavalry Regiment of the 1st Cavalry Division, during a battle with Chinese troops at Unsan in North Korea. Connell, who had been returned to the front after being injured in September, would become one of the few American MIAs whose remains would be returned to the United States. On July 12, 1993, North Koreans returned his dog tags to the United States, in a box containing the bones of four different individuals. It would take another 13 years for the government to positively identify his bones, using DNA from a relative. On May 13, 2006, more than 55 years after he had gone missing in action, Corporal Connell would finally be laid to rest, at the Gate of Heaven cemetery in Springfield.
- Died: George Bernard Shaw, 94, Irish writer, 1925 Nobel Prize in Literature laureate

== November 3, 1950 (Friday) ==
- Air India Flight 245 crashed into Mont Blanc, France, at an elevation of 15,000 feet, with the loss of all 40 lascar sailors and 8 crew. The Constellation airplane, dubbed the Malabar Princess, had been flying from Mumbai to London and ran into a snowstorm while flying over the Alps between Cairo and Geneva. At 3:43 pm, the pilot made his last contact with the Geneva airport and reported being over Grenoble, France. The wreckage would be spotted two days later, and an avalanche would kill a member of an eight-member rescue party on November 6 One engine from the plane would be found in 1989 at the Glacier des Bossons, and a second engine would go undiscovered until 2008. On January 24, 1966, Air India Flight 101, a Boeing 707 which was also on its way from Mumbai to London, would impact with Mont Blanc at 15,584 feet, killing all 117 on board.
- By a vote of 52 to 5 (with 2 abstentions) the United Nations General Assembly adopted the "Uniting for Peace" resolution, also known as the "Acheson Plan".
- A one-inch long earwig was the indirect cause of sinking three commercial motorships. The tiny insect had blocked the natural gas supply (and extinguished the light) in a lighthouse at Denmark's Grønsund strait between the island of Falster and the islands of Møn and Bogø. During the 75 minutes before the light could be restored, four ships ran aground, and three of them sank after their crews escaped.
- Died:
  - Koiso Kuniaki, 70, Prime Minister of Japan from 1944 to 1945 and convicted war criminal, of cancer while serving a life sentence at the Sugamo Prison.
  - John Wallace, 54, US murderer and one of the most wealthy men to be executed on a capital murder charge, executed by electric chair at Tattnall Prison, Georgia. The 1948 murder case would be dramatized in a book and a television movie, Murder in Coweta County.

== November 4, 1950 (Saturday) ==
- The United Nations General Assembly voted 38 to 10 (with ten abstentions) to approve General Assembly Resolution 386(V), repealing a 1946 vote that had barred all member nations from having diplomatic relations with Spain. The ban had been in place since December 12, 1946, when the members voted, 34–6, to not recognize the government of Generalissimo Francisco Franco.
- East Germany executed 24 of the 31 prisoners who had been convicted in April of subversion against the state.
- The European Convention for Protection of Human Rights and Fundamental Freedoms, drafted by the Council of Europe, was signed. It would come into effect on September 3, 1953, after being ratified by the United Kingdom, West Germany, Denmark, Norway, Sweden, Iceland, Ireland and Luxembourg, and create the European Court of Human Rights.
- Paul Nitze, the Director of Policy Planning for the U.S. State Department, met secretly with the U.S. Army Logistics Staff to discuss the feasibility of using nuclear weapons in the Korean War. General Herbert Loper, in charge of the Army's atomic weapons, advised him that the atomic bomb would not be useful except in rare cases where there was a large concentration of Chinese troops, and that the risks outweighed the benefits.
- The Battle of Unsan ended in Chinese victory.
- An F3 tornado touched down near Adamstown, Pennsylvania causing major damage.
- Born: Wolfgang Heichel, German rock musician in the Eurodisco band Dschinghis Khan; in Munich, West Germany
- Died: Grover Cleveland Alexander, 63, American major league baseball pitcher from 1911 to 1930, enshrinee of the Baseball Hall of Fame, known for leading the National League in games won and strikeouts in six seasons, for the lowest earned runs average in four seasons, and three time Triple Crown winner in all three categories in 1915, 1916 and 1920.

== November 5, 1950 (Sunday) ==
- The Battle of Pakchon, between Australian and Chinese forces in the Korea War, began as the 3rd Battalion, Royal Australian Regiment (3 RAR) captured a well-defended hill with limited offensive support, and held it in the face of heavy counter-attacks before making a disorganised night withdrawal.
- Eight North Korean fighters under the command of Kim Tal-hyon attacked 20 American aircraft in an air battle over North Korea. According to American accounts, Korean Yak-9 planes damaged two B-26 bombers, while Soviet accounts record that the North Koreans shot down five B-26 and one B-29 bomber. Both accounts agree that the North Koreans lost no planes in the battle.
- Shortly before midnight, the Chinese offensive abruptly halted across Korea, and the PLA forces temporarily withdrew, an action that one South Korean observer would later describe "as incomprehensible as it was welcome",
- Hour of Decision, a weekly radio broadcast by evangelist Billy Graham, was heard for the first time. Graham's sermons, both live and pre-recorded, have been heard every Sunday since then on the ABC Radio Network, then in syndicated form, and online.
- Automobile racer Phil Hill had a difficult beginning at the Pebble Beach Cup, when his Jaguar XK120 stalled at the start of the race. Despite starting in last place, 100 yards behind the rest of the group, he passed two cars on the first lap, then gradually increased his position over the remaining 48 miles and won the event in an unusual last-to-first comeback.

== November 6, 1950 (Monday) ==
- King Tribhuvan of Nepal fled to the Indian Embassy in Kathmandu after his Prime Minister, Field Marshal Mohan Shumsher, was preparing to have him arrested and replaced as the reigning monarch.
- The United Nations was advised in a cable from General Douglas MacArthur of proof that the People's Republic of China had entered the Korean War, based on the capture of prisoners of war from seven separate divisions of the Chinese army. The United States immediately scheduled a meeting of the UN Security Council for that Wednesday in order to consider MacArthur's recommendation that a large hydroelectric dam across the Yalu River should be destroyed if the Chinese armies were not withdrawn, along with all bridges that connected China to Korea.
- Composer Aaron Copland's Clarinet Concerto was performed for the first time, with Benny Goodman appearing with the NBC Symphony Orchestra on a national radio broadcast.
- British philosopher Bertrand Russell first delivered his essay, "Mind and Matter" in a lecture at Yale University.

== November 7, 1950 (Tuesday) ==
- In midterm congressional elections in the United States, the Democratic Party retained its majority, but lost 28 seats in the House of Representatives (from 263–171 to 235-199), and five in the Senate (from 54–42 to a two-seat lead of 49-47). In the closest race, incumbent Democrat William Benton narrowly defeated Republican investment banker Prescott Bush, father of future U.S. President George H. W. Bush as U.S. Senator for Connecticut 431,413 to 430,311), averting a 48–48 tie. Notably, U.S. Representative (and future U.S. president) Richard M. Nixon became one of California's U.S. Senators by defeating Helen Gahagan Douglas; James Roosevelt, the son of the late President Franklin D. Roosevelt, failed in a challenge against the incumbent Republican Governor of California (and future U.S. Chief Justice) Earl Warren.
- At the age of three years and four months old, Prince Gyanendra of Nepal was declared by Prime Minister Shumsher to be the new King, replacing his grandfather, King Tribhuvan. Following negotiations with India, Tribhuvan would return to the throne in January. Gyanendra would become last King of Nepal by succession in 2001 after the assassination of nine members of the royal family, including his father, King Birendra, by his brother, Prince Dipendra. The monarchy would be abolished in 2008 and Nepal would become a republic.
- Thailand entered the Korean War, when 2,100 men of the 21st Royal Thailand Regimental Combat Team arrived in Korea.

== November 8, 1950 (Wednesday) ==
- Flying an F-80C jet fighter, United States Air Force Lt. Russell J. Brown intercepted a North Korean MiG-15 near the Yalu River and reported that he shot it down, in the first jet-to-jet dogfight in history. However, the Soviet version is that the Russian pilot of the MiG-15, Senior Lt. Vladimir Kharitonov, reported to his superiors that he dived after his plane had been shot up by Brown's attack, and that he released his external fuel tanks, which exploded on the ground, before returning to base. Critics of Kharitonov's version state that "there was no reason for the MiG to be carrying external fuel tanks".
- The North Korean city of Sinuiju was attacked by 80 American B-29 planes that dropped 640 tons of incendiary bombs (85,000 in all) as part of an order that installations near the Chinese border were to be obliterated. A United States Air Force spokesman told reporters that the city of 100,000 inhabitants was "pretty well taken care of".
- Bombers from the U.S. Navy's Task Force 77 carried out attacks on the Yalu River bridges that connected China to North Korea, with strict orders not to attack the Chinese side of the bridges.

== November 9, 1950 (Thursday) ==
- The film Los Olvidados, directed by Luis Buñuel, had its world premiere in Mexico City. Released in the United States as The Young and the Damned, the drama about child poverty in Mexico would earn Buñuel the award for Best Director at the 1951 Cannes Film Festival, and make him famous worldwide.
- The adventure film King Solomon's Mines starring Deborah Kerr, Stewart Granger and Richard Carlson premiered at Radio City Music Hall in New York City.
- The National Security Council issued NSC Document 84/2, setting the basis for providing financial aid to the Philippines for reforms in including a restructuring of that nation's armed forces, redistribution of resources, and elimination of corruption, inefficient administrative services, and restoration of public confidence in the government.
- Sebastian Vayalil was consecrated Bishop of Pala, India, by Eugene Cardinal Tisserent.
- Born:
  - Parekura Horomia, New Zealand Minister of Maori Affairs from 2000 to 2008; in Tolaga Bay (died 2013)
  - Maravillas Rojo, Catalan politician and Spanish Secretary General for Employment; in Barcelona

== November 10, 1950 (Friday) ==
- A U.S. Air Force B-50 Superfortress bomber, experiencing an in-flight emergency, jettisoned and detonated a Mark IV nuclear bomb at 2,500 feet above the Saint Lawrence River, near Saint-André, Quebec. Slightly before 4:00 p.m., the explosion rocked the town and caused a thick cloud of yellow smoke. The plutonium core had been removed before transport, so the blast was limited to a conventional chemical explosion used to destroy the weapon, but 100 pounds of uranium were scattered in the river, and the weapon was never recovered.
- U.S. Navy Lt. Commander William T. Amen, flying an F9F Panther jet fighter, struck a Russian piloted MiG-15 jet fighter in Korea. Although Russian historians dispute whether Russell Brown had downed a MiG-15 two days earlier, it is agreed that the Amen scored a kill, with the Russian MiG crashing into a small hill.
- The Interstate Commerce Commission ordered the end of racial segregation in the dining cars of trains that traveled interstate routes, effective December 15. In response, the Southern Railway said that it ceased the practice four months earlier, on July 1, and the Louisville and Nashville Railroad had discontinued the practice of barring black passengers from sitting in dining cars previously reserved for white travelers. The Atlantic Coast Line Railroad, however, said that it would wait until the order was received and studied by its legal department.
- Born:
  - Debra Hill, American film producer and screenwriter (Halloween and The Fog), in Haddonfield, New Jersey (d. 2005)
  - "Cowboy Bob Orton", American professional wrestler, in Kansas City, Kansas.

== November 11, 1950 (Saturday) ==
- The Mattachine Society was founded in Los Angeles as the first gay liberation organization. The organizational meeting took place at the home of Harry Hay at 2328 Cove Avenue, with Rudi Gernreich, Bob Hull, Chuck Rowland and Dale Jennings completing the gathering.
- Representatives of the government of Tibet sought intervention from the United Nations to obtain the withdrawal of Chinese occupying troops from the eastern section of their nation.

== November 12, 1950 (Sunday) ==
- The first Volkswagen van rolled off of an assembly line in West Germany. Originally envisioned by a Dutch businessman, Ben Pon, in a sketch drawn April 23, 1947, the vehicle was referred to as "the T2" (the T1 having been the "Volkswagen Beetle"). The van, with multiple windows, would become popular with hippies and surfers in the 1960s.
- Jacobo Arbenz Guzmán was elected President of Guatemala receiving 266,778 votes, or 65.4% of the 407,633 cast. Future President Miguel Ydígoras Fuentes was second, with 76,180 votes (18.7%).
- The Barrier, an opera based on the Langston Hughes play Mulatto and adapted by composer Jan Meyerowitz, opened on Broadway. Despite having been a success at Columbia University earlier in the year, the play was poorly reviewed in Washington, D.C., in September because of its theme of racial discrimination, and the Broadway production closed after only three performances.
- Born: Ray Young Bear, American Indian poet, at the Meskwaki Settlement, Iowa
- Died:
  - Julia Marlowe (born Sarah Frances Frost), 85, English-born American stage actress best known for Shakespearean revivals on Broadway
  - Hryhorij Lakota, 57, Ukrainian Catholic bishop, while serving his sentence at the Abez gulag above the Arctic Circle. Lakota would become the inspiration for the main character in the 1963 novel The Shoes of the Fisherman and would be beatified in 2001
  - Pierre-Jules Boulanger, 65, French engineer and businessman who had been Chairman of the Board of the Citroën Motor Company since 1935, was killed when his Citroën Traction Avant skidded and crashed into a tree.

== November 13, 1950 (Monday) ==
- The President of Venezuela, Lt. Col. Carlos Delgado Chalbaud was kidnapped and murdered by assassins. President Delgado left home that morning, accompanied by his chauffeur and an aide to his office. Along the way, his car was blocked by several cars and a team of twenty conspirators. Though his aide was only slightly wounded, and his chauffeur left unharmed, Delgado was driven to an abandoned house on the outskirts of Caracas, beaten, and then shot six times. For the next two weeks, the other two members of Venezuela's military junta, Marcos Pérez Jiménez and Luis Felipe Llovera Páez, administered the nation before selecting a civilian adviser, Germán Suárez Flamerich, to be the new president. The leader of the conspiracy, Rafael Simon Urbina, was wounded in the attack and sought refuge in the Nicaraguan Embassy, but was arrested at the gate by a federal officer. Taken to a jail for treatment, Suárez allegedly tried to take a gun from one of the guards and was shot to death.
- United Kingdom Prime Minister Clement Attlee and Foreign Secretary Ernest Bevin proposed a plan for ending the Korean War, by establishing a buffer zone between Chinese and United Nations forces that would extend 60 to 100 miles south of the Yalu River. When the proposal became public, it was criticized in the United States as a betrayal comparable to the Munich Agreement of 1938 and General MacArthur replied that "to yield to so immoral a proposition would bankrupt our leadership and influence in Asia and render untenable our position both politically and militarily." After another two years and eight months of fighting, the war would be settled with the creation of the Korean Demilitarized Zone far to the south of the proposed British zone.
- A Curtiss-Reid Airtours charter plane crashed, transporting a group of missionaries home to Canada after their pilgrimage to Rome. Earlier that day, the group had visited with Pope Pius XII. On the way back through the fog, the pilot struck the 8,500-foot high Mont Obiou in the French Alps. All 52 passengers and six crew were killed.
- In New York, CBS gave the public its first demonstrations of its new color television technology. The closed circuit broadcasts, shown in a display window on Fifth Avenue, featured various segments with model Patty Painter wearing a striped blouse while displaying red and yellow roses, a bowl of fresh fruit, colorful packs of soap and cigarettes, flags of various nations, a map of Europe, and reproductions of paintings by Vincent van Gogh. The next day, CBS began five such telecasts each day, with up to 300 people invited to watch in preparation for the regular nationwide broadcasting on November 20.
- Born: Gilbert Perreault, Canadian ice hockey player, in Victoriaville, Quebec

== November 14, 1950 (Tuesday) ==
- Jack Mullin, working on an investment by Ampex and Bing Crosby Enterprises, filed the first patent for a videotape recorder. U.S. Patent 2,794,066 would be issued on May 28, 1957.;
- French vascular surgeon Jacques Oudot performed the first arterial graft on a human being, operating at a Paris hospital on a 51-year-old woman with aortic occlusion of the left leg. The patient reportedly made a successful recovery.
- Carbon-14 dating of the Dead Sea Scrolls began when Carl H. Kraeling sent a cloth from the Cave I scroll wrapper to Dr. Willard Libby at the University of Chicago. Libby would conclude that the wrapper had been made no earlier than 160 B.C. and no later than 390 A.D.
- Jack Gardner knocked out Bruce Woodcock in the 11th round of their title fight, to become British heavyweight boxing champion.
- Died: Orhan Veli Kanık, 36, Turkish poet, of a brain aneurysm

== November 15, 1950 (Wednesday) ==
- On petition by NBC and its parent company, RCA, a temporary restraining order was issued against CBS by a three judge panel of the U.S. District Court in Chicago, halting the CBS color television broadcasts that had been scheduled to begin on November 20. In December, the court would deny the injunction and permit CBS to launch its broadcasts on the televisions equipped with the CBS "spinning disk" system.
- Fourteen people were killed in a rail accident in Norway near Hjuksebø. Passenger train no. 72, en route from Kristiansand to Oslo, was struck by four freight cars that had become uncoupled from another train. It remained Norway's worst railway accident in peacetime until the Tretten train disaster in 1975.
- Born: William Kent Krueger, American crime writer, in Torrington, Wyoming.

== November 16, 1950 (Thursday) ==
- With the restoration of diplomatic relations with Spain and the regime of Generalissimo Franco, U.S. President Truman authorized a loan of $62,500,000 to Spain to help it rearm its military and to prevent it from becoming an ally of the Soviet Union.
- The 16 owners of the Major League Baseball teams approved a request by Commissioner A. B. "Happy" Chandler to the leagues' $975,000 of radio and television rights, from the 1950 World Series toward the player's pension fund.
- Died: Dr. Robert H. Smith, 71, popularly known as "Dr. Bob", co-founder of Alcoholics Anonymous in 1935.

== November 17, 1950 (Friday) ==
- Fifteen year old Tenzin Gyatso was enthroned as the 14th Dalai Lama, becoming both the chief of state of the semi-independent kingdom, and the spiritual leader of adherents of Tibetan Buddhism worldwide. The date of November 17, 1950 had been set after consultation with the astrologers of the Nechung oracle, and Gyatso replaced regent Taktra Rinpoche. Born as Lhamo Thondup on July 6, 1935 (the 5th day of the 5th year of the Wooden Dog in the Tibetan calendar), and identified as the reincarnation of the 13th Dalai Lama, who had died in 1933, Thondup had arrived at Lhasa when he was four years old, and installed on the Lion's Throne four months later.
- Adriaan Pelt, the United Nations High Commissioner for Libya, submitted his report to the UN General Assembly, calling for a creation of a National Assembly for Libya in order to unite the territories of Cyrenaica, Tripoli and Fezzan.
- Born:
  - Roland Matthes, East German swimmer who won gold medals for the 100m and 200m backstroke in the 1968 and 1972 Summer Olympics and in the 1973 World Championships; in Pößneck, Thuringia state (d. 2019)
  - Harold James Nicholson, American CIA officer arrested and convicted in 1996 for espionage for the Russian intelligence service SVR; now serving a 28-year prison term at the Supermax (Federal penitentiary in Florence, Colorado); in Woodburn, Oregon

== November 18, 1950 (Saturday) ==
- After rain prevented play on the first day of their match against New South Wales Country, the touring MCC side's batting collapsed to a fast bowler called John Bull, who took 6/24. They reached 142 all out thanks to a 71 from John Dewes, and the match was drawn.
- The #1 ranked Ohio State Buckeyes college football team lost a game against the #8 Illinois Fighting Illini, 14–7, effectively ending its chance to be the NCAA football champion. The #2 ranked Oklahoma Sooners remained unbeaten (and racked up their 29th consecutive victory) after defeating the unranked Missouri Tigers, 41–7. The next day, the sportswriters voted Oklahoma to first place in the Associated Press poll. Oklahoma would retain the top ranking through the end of the season.
- A bus driver saved 33 Western State College football players from injury and death after the brakes failed while they were traveling downhill through Monarch Pass in the Rocky Mountains. The team was on its way from Gunnison, Colorado to Canon City for a game against Adams State College, when the air pressure failed in the college-owned bus, and the gearshift moved out of second gear into neutral. Even worse, the gear shift broke when head coach Joe Thomas was trying to put the bus back in gear, and the emergency hand brake didn't slow the speed. For the next 17 minutes, driver Jerry Tobin steered the vehicle around 23 miles of hairpin curves at speeds of up to 110 miles per hour (and passing one car while avoiding an oncoming vehicle) before bringing it to a stop at Salida. The players assisted by shifting from one side of the bus to the other at Tobin's direction. Despite the near-fatal experience, the Western State Mountaineers beat the Adams State Grizzlies, 35–14.
- "Harbor Lights" by Sammy Kaye And His Orchestra topped the Billboard Best Sellers in Stores chart.

== November 19, 1950 (Sunday) ==
- At its annual meeting, the American Red Cross board of governors voted to discontinue the endorsement of putting racial designations on blood donations. "It has long been known that human blood is all alike, from whatever race it comes", the press release noted.

== November 20, 1950 (Monday) ==
- American prisoners of war (from the 8th Cavalry Regiment and the 24th Infantry Division) had been marched into a detention camp in the North Korean village of Pyoktong, and were almost killed when U.S. B-26 bombers carried out an airstrike. The 450 POWs survived the bombing, though half of Pyoktong was incinerated, including their intended prison, and the group was then marched to a new site at the village of Sombokol.

== November 21, 1950 (Tuesday) ==
- Troops of the 7th Infantry Division of the United States Army's X Corps became the first American division to reach the Yalu River that separated North Korea and China, moving into the border city of Hyesan. By that time, the X Corps had advanced so much further north than the U.S. Eighth Army (on a second drive), the two armies were separated by a huge gap that the Chinese Army would exploit.
- The head-on collision of two trains killed 21 people near Valemount, British Columbia. A westbound train was carrying Canadian soldiers preparing to join the Korean War, while the eastbound Canadian National Railway's Continental Limited was on the same track. The collision killed 17 Canadian soldiers, and the two-man locomotive crews on each train.
- Twenty-one missionaries of the Christian evangelical organization, the New Tribes Mission, and three crew members, were on the first flight of their new DC-3 airplane when it crashed into Mount Moran in the Grand Teton National Park in Wyoming. The flight came four months after another 15 people were killed in the June 9 crash of another DC-3 owned by the Mission. Everyone on board was killed, including founder Paul Fleming, and two widows and six children of men who had been killed in the first crash. Nobody was able to reach the wreckage until the following summer, and some of the bodies have never been found.
- Mamoru Shigemitsu, the Japanese Foreign Minister who signed Japan's surrender on board the USS Missouri on September 2, 1945, was released from prison after serving four years and seven months of his seven-year sentence for war crimes.
- A rocket launched from Los Alamos, New Mexico, snapped a picture of the earth below it after it reached its peak altitude of 107 miles. At the time, it set a record for the highest altitude from which a photograph had been taken.

== November 22, 1950 (Wednesday) ==
- Seventy-nine commuters were killed, and 363 injured, while on their way home from their jobs on the night before Thanksgiving Day, when two Long Island Rail Road commuter trains collided at Richmond Hill in the New York City borough of Queens. The first train, taking New York City workers to their homes near Hempstead, had stalled on the tracks. Although a flagman had signaled a warning with red lamps, the engineer of the next train coming up the line misinterpreted a signal, and, at 6:26 pm, the 12-car Babylon Express rear-ended the Hempstead-bound train.
- The Fort Wayne Pistons beat the Minneapolis Lakers, 19–18, in the lowest scoring game in National Basketball Association history. The event was one of several that led to the NBA implementation of the shot clock in 1954. Pistons coach Murray Mendenhall had ordered his team to stall from the opening tipoff, and for stretches as long as three minutes at a time, the Pistons passed the ball around without taking a shot. Larry Foust finally won the game for them with six seconds to play. The game's high scorer was Jack Kerris, with five points.
- Under a truce flag, the Chinese Army released 27 wounded American prisoners of war, delivering them to the U.S. Army at a location north of Yongbyon, North Korea.
- General Douglas MacArthur told visiting members of the United Nations Temporary Commission on Korea that he expected that the Korean War would be over by the end of the year. He also described plans for holding elections in North Korea in 1951 for 100 seats in a 310-seat Korean parliament.
- Born:
  - Greg Luzinski, American baseball outfielder and designated hitter, 1975 National League RBI leader and 1978 Roberto Clemente Award winner; in Chicago
  - Lyman Bostock, American baseball outfielder known for being murdered in a drive-by shooting; in Birmingham, Alabama (killed, 1978)

== November 23, 1950 (Thursday) ==
- Chang Myon, often referred to in the western press as "John M. Chang", the name he used while Ambassador to the United States, became Prime Minister of South Korea. He would resign on April 20, 1952, then return to service as the Vice President under President Syngman Rhee, and serve as Prime Minister a second time from 1960 to 1961.
- The People's Republic of China, through the Administration Council of its Supreme People's Court, issued the "Directive Concerning the Suppression of Counter-Revolutionary Activities", directing all Chinese Communist Party members and China citizens to report suspected conspiratorial activities. The ensuing campaign would be followed, three months later, by regulations on how to punish anyone convicted of trying to destroy the "people's democratic cause".
- The National Assembly of France voted 337 to 187 to approve plans to transfer the administration to South Vietnam authorities of the Vietnamese lands of the French Indochina by the end of the year, and to gradually let the Army of the Republic of Viet Nam (ARVN) take over the war effort against the Viet Minh.
- Born: Chuck Schumer, U.S. Senate Majority Leader since 2021, Chair of the Senate Democratic Caucus, U.S. Senator from New York since 1999; in Brooklyn, New York

== November 24, 1950 (Friday) ==
- The "Home-by-Christmas" Offensive was launched at 10:00 a.m. Korean time, by General MacArthur as a final assault by United Nations forces to take all of North Korea up to the Yalu River border with China. At "H-Hour", the armies began a drive northward. The next day would see an overwhelming retaliation by China's People's Volunteer Army, with a confrontation at the Ch'ongch'on River.
- An unusually strong winter storm, that would eventually kill 383 Americans, began east of the Appalachian Mountains. With hurricane-force winds, the storm affected 22 of the 48 United States, primarily in the northeastern U.S. The storm had first been noted at 7:30 pm Eastern time, with temperatures plummeting during the afternoon, and the collision of cold and warm air masses produced winds of more than 50 miles per hour. Within two days, there were 211 deaths in 21 states, the majority of them heart attacks that had been brought about by shoveling snow.
- The accidental release of hydrogen sulphide gas from a factory at Poza Rica, Mexico, caused 22 deaths and 320 hospitalizations of city residents. The toxic cloud had been concentrated over the area by a combination of a low inversion layer, thick fog, and weak winds.
- The Frank Loesser musical Guys and Dolls premiered on Broadway, at the 46th Street Theatre, and would go on for 1,200 performances, winning the Tony Award for Best Musical. Among the songs written for the play were "Luck Be a Lady" and "A Bushel and a Peck".
- China announced an addition to its territory with the establishment of the "East Tibetan Autonomous Region" of 70,000 people, governed by a Tibetan Communist, Tian Bao.
- Born: Stanley Livingston, American child actor who portrayed "Chip Douglas" on the situation comedy My Three Sons; in Los Angeles

== November 25, 1950 (Saturday) ==
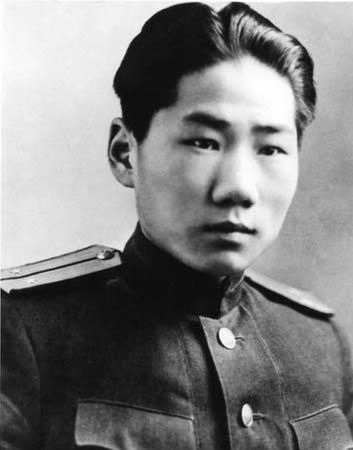
Mao Anying

- Chances at an early truce in the Korean War were ruined when American bombers made a raid on Pyongan. Among the casualties of the destruction of the Chinese People's Volunteer Army headquarters was Mao Anying, described by one author as the "favorite son" of China's leader Mao Zedong. Mao's commanding general, Peng Dehuai narrowly missed being killed in the attack.
- The Battle of the Ch'ongch'on River began at dusk, Peng and the Chinese Army opened their "Second Phase Offensive", with the 180,000 troops of the Thirteenth CPV Army Corps now blocking the advance of the United Nations troops, and cutting off the retreat by the American troops in I Corps and IX Corps.
- The Republic of Haiti received a new Constitution, replacing previous ones that had been ratified in 1805, 1889, 1918 and 1946.
- In a game forever known as the "Mud Bowl" for the wet and muddy conditions at Toronto's Varsity Stadium, the Toronto Argonauts defeated the Winnipeg Blue Bombers 13–0 to win the 38th Grey Cup of Canadian football.
- Died:
  - Johannes V. Jensen, 77, Danish author, 1944 Nobel Prize in Literature laureate
  - Gustaf John Ramstedt, 77, Finland-born Swedish linguist and diplomat

== November 26, 1950 (Sunday) ==
- Voters in Uruguay went to the polls to cast ballots for all elective offices at the local, regional, and national levels, Andrés Martínez Trueba was elected as the new President of Uruguay under the rules of the South American republic's unique system. Under the constitution, each political party was allowed to have three presidential candidates on the general election ballot. The votes for a party's candidates were added together to determine which political party would control the executive branch, and the top finisher among that party's candidates would become the President. The Colorado Party's candidates combined for 55.1% of the total vote, compared to 29.3% for the National Party, and of the three candidates, Martínez Trueba had more votes than either of his rivals, César Mayo Gutiérrez and Eduardo Blanco Acevedo.

== November 27, 1950 (Monday) ==
- Three days after the United Nations Command had launched its "Home by Christmas Offensive" with 110,000 troops surging northward, the People's Republic of China launched a massive counterattack with 300,000 soldiers. The United States 25th Infantry Division was one of the first to report fierce resistance, near Unsan. Chinese attacks began with bugle calls and whistles, followed by thousands of soldiers charging forward. The 25th Infantry and the 2nd Infantry Division began retreating back across the Ch'ongch'on River and toward the frozen Chosin Reservoir. At the Chosin Reservoir the 1st Marine Division, British Royal Commandos, and U.S. Army infantry also came under heavy attack.
- Turkey fought its first real combat action since its War of Independence when it attempted to delay the Chinese advance in the Battle of Wawon.
- Germán Suárez Flamerich was named as the new President of Venezuela by the remaining two members of the military junta, two weeks after the assassination of Lt. Col. Carlos Delgado Chalbaud.
- Born: Robert Bartlett, English historian, at Streatham

== November 28, 1950 (Tuesday) ==
- The 723 residents of Ellenton, South Carolina, were notified on a noon radio broadcast that their town was going to be relocated so that construction could begin for the Savannah River Site, a plant for the making of plutonium and tritium for hydrogen bomb construction. DuPont concluded that cooling pipes for the Savannah River nuclear reactors would need to run through the land occupied by Ellenton. The Atomic Energy Commission would agree on December 28 to the measure. Subsequently, the homes and buildings in Ellenton, and of another 5300 people in Aiken County and Barnwell County, were moved to a site 14 miles away, and the city of New Ellenton, South Carolina was created.
- Five days after telling reporters that American troops would be able to be "home by Christmas" from Korea, General MacArthur released a statement in Tokyo declaring that "We face an entirely new war", and estimated Chinese forces in Korea to be at least 200,000 men. "This has shattered the high hope we had that the intervention of the Chinese was only of a token nature on a volunteer and individual basis as publicly announced", he added.
- United States Representative L. Mendel Rivers of South Carolina was one of several members of Congress who urged that General MacArthur should be given authority to use the atomic bomb to end the Korean War. "If there ever was a time to use the A-bomb", Rivers told reporters, "it is now." He added that he had sent a telegram to President Truman recommending that an ultimatum be served on China to either withdraw its troops, or face "relentless atomic warfare".
- The undefeated University of Oklahoma Sooners won the mythical national championship of college football after receiving 213 first place votes in the Associated Press poll of sportswriters. The United States Military Academy football team, known athletically as the "Army Cadets", was a distant second, with 38 votes. Under the point system that assigned values for first through tenth place votes, Oklahoma had 2,963 to Army's 2,380 points. At the time, no polling was taken after the postseason bowl games; Oklahoma would go on to lose the 1950 Sugar Bowl in an upset by the University of Kentucky.
- New Mexico Governor Thomas J. Mabry met with a 91-year-old man, O. L. Roberts, who claimed to have been frontier outlaw William H. Bonney, known as "Billy the Kid". He brought Roberts to a press conference at the governor's office in Santa Fe. Although it is generally believed that Billy the Kid was killed in 1881, Roberts claimed to be the outlaw in 1949 and spent 18 months petitioning the Governor for a pardon. After Roberts was unable to answer reporters' questions, Governor Mabry announced, "I am taking no action, now or ever... because I do not believe this man is Billy the Kid." Roberts died 30 days later.
- The "Colombo Plan for Co-operative Economic Development in South and South-East Asia" was published by a consultative committee of representatives from Australia, Britain, Canada, Ceylon (now Sri Lanka), India, New Zealand and Pakistan, outlining a program for the advancement of the economies in the Asian nations that were members of the British Commonwealth.
- The first Japan Series of baseball ended in Tokyo with the Mainichi Orions (champions of the Pacific League) defeating the Shochiku Robins (pennant winners of the Central League, 8 to 7, to win the championship, four games to two.
- Born:
  - Russell Hulse, American physicist and co-winner of the 1993 Nobel Prize in Physics; in New York City
  - Ed Harris, American film actor and director, known for Apollo 13; in Englewood, New Jersey
- Died: James Corbitt, 37, English murderer, was hanged at Strangeways Prison, Manchester, by his former friend Albert Pierrepoint.

== November 29, 1950 (Wednesday) ==
- The National Council of the Churches of Christ was founded through the alliance of the Federal Council of Churches of Christ in America, the International Council of Religious Education, the Foreign Missions Conference of North America, the Home Missions Council and other interdenominational boards, comprising 25 Protestant and four Orthodox denominations, but not including Southern Baptist Convention, Lutheran Church–Missouri Synod or Pentecostals. The Federal Council itself had been created in 1908 by the delegates of 30 different denominations. With a goal of cooperation of churches in social activists, the National Council has tended to attract liberal leaders, while the American Council of Christian Churches, the World Christian Fundamentals Association, and the National Association of Evangelicals have had more conservative leadership.
- The Battle of Wawon ended in Chinese tactical victory, but Turkish strategic victory, when the Chinese advance was halted long enough for United Nations forces to withdraw without taking heavy casualties.
- Died: Walter Beech, aviator and airplane manufacturer

== November 30, 1950 (Thursday) ==
- At a press conference, U.S. President Truman frightened many when he answered reporters following up on his statement that the United States would "take whatever steps are necessary to meet the military situation in Korea". When Jack Dougherty of the Daily News of New York asked, "Will that include the atomic bomb?", Truman replied, "That includes every weapon that we have." Paul R. Leach of the Chicago Daily News then asked, "Does that mean that there is active consideration of the use of the atomic bomb?", and Truman said, "There has always been active consideration of its use." A third reporter, Merriman Smith of United Press, asked Truman "Did we understand you clearly" about active consideration of atomic weapons in Korea, and the President reaffirmed that it "always has been. It is one of our weapons." Concern was so strong that Prime Minister Attlee of the United Kingdom flew to Washington for an emergency meeting with the President.
- The Army of France entered the Korean War with the arrival of the 1,100-man Bataillon de Coree (Battalion of Korea), generally referred to as the French Battalion. The three companies of men (1st Company from colonial troops, 2nd Company from the France and its Metropolitan area, and the 3rd company from the Foreign Legion and paratroopers) were assigned to the 23rd Infantry Regiment of the Second U.S. Infantry. Earlier in the year, a crew of 143 French Navy men patrolled off the coast on the frigate RFS La Grandiere, from July 29 to November 23.
- Inventor Earl Masterson applied for the patent for the first rotating tape head for magnetic video recording. U.S. Patent No. 2,773,120 would be issued on December 4, 1956.
- Died: Werner Haase, 50, German doctor who served as Adolf Hitler's personal physician, and advised him on how to commit suicide; of tuberculosis in the Soviet Union's Butyrka prison.
