= Instruction for a Ruler =

2018 edition of De principis instructione

- Editor: Robert Bartlett
- Author: Gerald of Wales
- Translator: Robert Bartlett
- Language: Latin and English
- Series: Oxford Medieval Texts
- Published: 2018
- Publisher: Clarendon Press
- Pages: 801, lxviii
- ISBN: 978-0-19-873862-6

Instruction for a Ruler is a 2018 critical edition and parallel text English translation of Gerald of Wales's De principis instructione. In addition to the translated text, it contains an extensive introduction detailing its manuscript history, Gerald's use of sources, and a synopsis of its three books.

It is the first edition to contain the complete text, and replaced the 1891 Rolls Series publication as the standard edition.

Reviewers praised it, describing it as supporting further research into Gerald and the political and intellectual history of the twelfth and thirteenth centuries.

== Background ==
De principis instructione is a medieval Latin treatise on kingship by Gerald of Wales. The first book, or distinction, takes the form of a traditional "mirror for princes", while the second and third present a narrative of the reign of King Henry II of England and constitute a sustained polemic against him and the Angevin dynasty.

The first book likely circulated c. 1191, while the complete work was likely released c. 1216×1217. It is considered an important source for historical events of the period, including as evidence for views critical of the English monarchy at the time of the Magna Carta.

=== Publication history ===
Extracts from De principis instructione first appeared in print in 1715, and more extensive extracts were published in 1822. In 1846 J. S. Brewer published the second and third books, along with parts of the first, and in 1858 Joseph Stevenson produced a translation of the second and third books, at which time De principis instructione reached its widest audience. In 1891 George Warner edited the work for the Rolls Series, including most of the first book.

Warner's 1891 edition remained the standard edition until 2018 when Bartlett published this edition, including for the first time the complete text of the first book.

== Summary ==
Bartlett's volume is a critical edition and English translation of Gerald of Wales's De principis instructione. It presents all three distinctions in parallel text format, with the Latin text and English translation on facing pages. The volume comprises 801 pages in addition to a 68-page introduction which contains five tables, two genealogical charts, and a concordance with George Warner's 1891 edition.

=== Introduction ===
The edition gives a brief introduction to Gerald of Wales before turning to the manuscript transmission of De principis instructione. Bartlett identifies British Library, Cotton MS Julius B XIII as the sole surviving manuscript, and gives an account of other copies recorded but now lost. He also treats the composition and publication history of the work, including the version published c. 1191 and the revised version of c. 1216–1217.

Bartlett also discusses the original preface from Cambridge, Trinity College MS R.7.11, where it is preserved in Gerald's Symbolum electorum. The introduction also gives a synopsis of the three book, and a chronology of the events covered in the second and third book.

A large part of the introduction concerns Gerald's sources. Bartlett identifies his use of biblical, classical, patristic, and royal and papal letters, including Laudabiliter and the forged Quoniam ea. He also treats Gerald's reuse of his own writings, describing him as "one of the great auto-plagiarists of the Middle Ages". The introduction identifies Ranulf Higden as the only medieval author known to have relied on De principis instructione, and includes a table setting out Higden's use of the work. It ends with genealogical charts of the families of Henry II of England and Louis VII of France.

=== Text and translation ===
The edited text is based on Cotton MS Julius B XIII, which contains Gerald's revised version of c. 1216–1217. Bartlett also includes the original preface preserved in Cambridge, Trinity College MS R.7.11.

The first book is a mirror-for-princes text concerned with rulership and moral conduct, which Bartlett describes as "largely derivative". The second and third book give Gerald's account of the reign of Henry II, including material on English and French politics from the murder of Thomas Becket in 1170 to Henry's death in 1189.

== Reception ==
Sean McGlynn described Bartlett's volume as "an invaluable and hugely impressive work of deep and enduring scholarship", though he criticised the title Instruction for a Ruler, arguing that the traditional title The Instruction of Princes better placed Gerald's work within the mirror for princes genre.

Keagan Brewer called the edition a "scholarly achievement" and described the translation as accurate and readable, while observing that it sometimes favours readability over literal rendering. Martin Aurell approved of this decision to favour clarity, since the Latin text is printed on the facing page.

Aurell described the edition as an important instrument for the study of the political and intellectual history of the twelfth and thirteenth centuries. Georgia Henley called it an "exceptional edition" and wrote that it would support further work on Gerald's style, sources, and authorial interests.

== See also ==
- Gerald of Wales, 1146–1223, an 1982 biographical study of Gerald of Wales by Robert Bartlett
