= William of Poitiers =

11th-century Norman historian

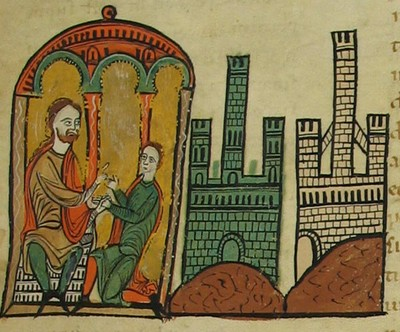

William of Poitiers (Latin: Guillelmus Pictaviensis, French: Guillaume de Poitiers; c. 1020 – 1090) was a Norman priest. He served as the chaplain of Duke William II of Normandy (William the Conqueror), for whom he chronicled the Norman conquest of England in his Gesta Willelmi ducis Normannorum et regis Anglorum ("The Deeds of William, Duke of the Normans and King of the English").

== Life ==
Most information about Poitiers comes from Orderic Vitalis in his Historia Ecclesiactica, written in 1114–1115 and 1125. He was apparently born in Les Préaux, France, near Pont-Audemer to an influential knightly Norman family, probably about 1020. According to Orderic, William originally trained as a knight, which gave him a much greater insight into the details of war than the typical medieval clerical writer. About 1049 he decided to enter the church, turning away from his knightly duties. Once he turned to the priesthood, William studied at the school of Saint Hilaire-le-Grand in Poitiers and was said by Orderic to have returned to Normandy 'more learned than all his friends and neighbours'.

William was given positions of ecclesiastical authority, becoming chaplain to Duke William and archdeacon of Lisieux. However, he doesn't appear in ecclesiastical or royal and ducal charters as might be expected of someone of such a position, which perhaps casts doubts over Orderic's account. Little is known about his old age. Orderic stated that William of Poitiers was forced to stop writing his history of William the Conqueror due to ″unfavorable circumstances″, of unknown nature. Possible links between William of Poitiers and Duke William's rebellious son Robert may provide an explanation.

== Gesta Guillelmi ==
William of Poitiers wrote Gesta Guillelmi some time after 1066. It recounts how Duke William prepared for, and achieved, the Conquest of England. It justifies William's succession to the English throne. The bulk of the writing probably took place between 1071 and 1077.

Gesta Guillelmi is the earliest extended biography of any Duke of Normandy, and is an invaluable source for the Battle of Hastings in 1066. William of Poitiers was well placed to write it, with his military training and role as chaplain within Duke William's household.

No manuscripts survive. André Duchesne published an edition in 1619, although his (now lost) manuscript was missing its beginning and end. Its present form covers the period from 1047 to 1068, and starts and finishes mid-sentence. Retrospective material concerns affairs in England after Cnut’s death (1035). Orderic stated that it originally finished in 1071.

=== Critiques ===
William of Poitiers undoubtedly thought of himself as an historian. He mentions in Gesta Guillelmi that the duty of a historian is to remain within the 'bounds of the truth.'; but he failed to obey this rule. Antonia Gransden reported that William of Poitiers was just as much a panegyrist as a historian. She claimed that Gesta Guillelmi was biased and unreliable, and offered unrealistic portraits of the protagonists. Moreover, Orderic, who used Gesta Guillelmi as his principal source in creating Ecclesiastical History, omitted or contradicted many of Poitiers' claims, including denial of King William's mercy to the conquered English; having been brought up in England from 1075–1085, Orderic knew better. However, panegyrical passages are easy to spot, and much of the material is accurate.

== Influence and legacy ==
=== Anglo-Saxon society ===
William of Poitiers offers a few insights into pre-Conquest Anglo-Saxon society. For example, he reports that a Danish raiding party returned from England with 'great booty'. Furthermore, Harold is claimed to have had 'abundant treasure with which to tempt dukes'. This may explain the numerous attacks England suffered during the 10th – early 11th century. Poitiers stated that the pre-Conquest English 'all showed love of their country', suggesting some sort of national identity that was not present in Normandy.

=== Norman society ===
William of Poitiers depicts Norman France prior to 1066, detailing the various rebellions Duke William faced in his early reign. The local Norman lords constantly waged private wars in contrast with the relatively stable kingdom across the Channel. The domestic turbulence forced Duke William to confront and subdue his nobility, by co-operation or coercion; for example, despite revolting against Duke William, Gesta Guillemi states that Guy of Burgundy was allowed to remain in his court. Poitiers reported that the Norman castle was an important element of society. An effective Duke could use them as strategic power bases, stamping their authority on the rural Duchy; however, a castle could also be a rallying point for rebellious nobles. William of Poitiers reported many ducal sieges.

=== Medieval literary tradition ===
William of Poitiers's history repeatedly highlights William's admirable qualities, claiming that the Duke 'excelled in intelligence, assiduity, and strength'. For him, Duke William embodied the perfect ideals of knighthood, as illustrated by improbable stories; for example he stated that William, with 50 knights, fought and bested a force of 1000. Poitiers relates Duke William's exploits to those of the Greek and Roman world. For example, he offers a lengthy comparison between William and Julius Caesar’s (attempted) conquest of Britain.

=== Battle of Hastings ===
Gesta Guillelmi provides the traditional narrative of the Battle of Hastings. William of Poitiers gives detailed descriptions of both the Norman and Anglo Saxon armies. Furthermore, he describes the 'feigned flight' manoeuvre.

However, he does not mention the method of King Harold's demise, casting doubt on the traditional 'arrow-in-the-eye' account quoted by later chroniclers.

== Sources ==
- William of Poitiers, Gesta Guillelmi, ed. and tr. R. H. C. Davis and Marjorie Chibnall (1998). The Gesta Guillelmi of William of Poitiers. OMT. Oxford and New York: Clarendon. ISBN 0-19-820553-8. Modern edition, with English translation and commentary. Earlier editions include:
  - Foreville, R., ed. (1952). Guillaume de Poitiers: Histoire de Guillaume le Conquérant. Les Classiques de l'histoire de France au Moyen Age 23. Paris: Les Belles Lettres. Edition, with modern French translation.
  - Migne, J.-P., ed. (1882). "Willelmi Conquestoris gesta a Willelmo Pictauensi Lexouiorum archidiacono contemporaneo scripta". Patrologia Latina. Vol. 149. Paris. col. 1217–1270.
  - Giles, J. A., ed. (1845). "Gesta Willelmi ducis Normannorum et regis Anglorum". Scriptores Rerum Gestarum Willelmi Conquestoris. London: Caxton Society. pp. 77–159.
- Orderic Vitalis, Historia ecclesiastica, ed. and tr. Marjorie Chibnall (1968–1980). The Ecclesiastical History of Orderic Vitalis. 6 vols. OMT. Oxford: OUP.
