= The Normans (TV series) =

- Title screenshot
- Genre: Historical documentary
- Presented by: Robert Bartlett
- Country of origin: United Kingdom
- Original language: English
- No. of series: 1
- No. of episodes: 3

Production
- Executive producer: Chris Granlund
- Producer: Robin Dashwood
- Running time: 60 minutes

Original release
- Network: BBC Two
- Release: 4 August – 18 August 2010

The Normans is a British television documentary series first aired on BBC Two from 4 to 18 August 2010. Over three episodes, it sees Professor Robert Bartlett's journey from Great Britain via Jerusalem to the Kingdom of Sicily to examine the expansion and ambition of the Normans between the 10th and 13th centuries.

== Episode list ==
No.	Title	Directed by	Original release date
1	"Men from the North"	Robin Dashwood	4 August 2010
2	"Conquest"	Fatima Salaria	11 August 2010
3	"Normans of the South"	Charles Colville	18 August 2010

== Episode overview ==
=== Men from the North ===
In the first episode of the three-part series, Professor Robert Bartlett explores how the Normans developed from a band of marauding Vikings into the formidable warriors who conquered England in 1066. He tells how the Normans established their new province of Normandy - land of the northmen - in northern France. They went on to build some of the finest churches in Europe and turned into an unstoppable force of Christian knights and warriors, whose legacy is all around us to this day. Under the leadership of Duke William, the Normans expanded into the neighbouring provinces of northern France. But William's greatest achievement was the conquest of England in 1066. The Battle of Hastings marked the end of the Anglo-Saxon aristocracy and monarchy. The culture and politics of England would now be transformed by the Normans.

=== Conquest ===
In the second of this three-part series, Professor Robert Bartlett explores the impact of the Norman conquest of Britain and Ireland. Bartlett shows how William the Conqueror imposed a new aristocracy, savagely cut down opposition and built scores of castles and cathedrals to intimidate and control. He also commissioned the Domesday Book, the greatest national survey of England that had ever been attempted. England adapted to its new masters and both the language and culture were transformed as the Normans and the English intermarried. Bartlett shows how the political and cultural landscape of Scotland, Wales and Ireland were also forged by the Normans and argues that the Normans created the blueprint for colonialism in the modern world.

=== Normans of the South ===
Professor Robert Bartlett explores the impact of the Normans on southern Europe and the Middle East. The Normans spread south in the 11th century, winning control of southern Italy and the island of Sicily. There they created their most prosperous kingdom, where Christianity and Islam co-existed in relative harmony and mutual tolerance. It became a great centre of medieval culture and learning. But events in the Middle East provoked the more aggressive side of the Norman character. In 1095, the Normans enthusiastically answered the Pope's call for holy war against Islam and joined the first crusade. They lay siege to Jerusalem and eventually helped win back the holy city from the Muslims. This bloody conquest left a deep rift between Christianity and Islam which is still being felt to this day.

== Reception ==
Reviewing the first episode for The Guardian, Lucy Mangan found the programme "splendid": "plunking down facts firmly and stepping nimbly along them, while managing to convey all the strangeness and excitement of medieval history." Simon Usborne for The Independent said that "although stolid at times, Bartlett's tone let the history do the talking", and he found it was airing along with Dan Snow's Norman Walks on BBC Four made for "a winning double-act". In The Daily Telegraph, John Preston found Bartlett's style "confers an unusual amount of authority and urgency" and said his "account of the events leading up to the Battle of Hastings was rivetingly good".
