= Gerald of Wales, 1146–1223 =

Biographical study of Gerald of Wales

- Author: Robert Bartlett
- Subject: Gerald of Wales
- Genre: Biographical study
- Publisher: Clarendon Press
- Publication date: 1982
- ISBN: 0-19-821892-3

Gerald of Wales, 1146–1223 is a 1982 biographical study of Gerald of Wales by Robert Bartlett. The book is divided into three parts dealing with Gerald's politics and identity, his treatment of the natural and supernatural, and his ethnographic writing. A revised edition was published in 2006 as Gerald of Wales: A Voice of the Middle Ages.

== Summary ==
A biographical study rather than a biography, the work is divided into three parts: "Politics and Nationality", "The Natural and The Supernatural", and "Ethnography".

"Politics and Nationality" contains approximately half of the book in three chapters: "'Gerald of Wales' or 'Gerald the Welshman'", on Gerald's national identity; "Gerald the Ecclesiastic", on his ecclesiastical experience and ideal of reform; and "Kings", on his political opinions, including an extended discussion of his polemic against the Angevin dynasty in De principis instructione.

This part is biographical and considers the social context in which Gerald wrote, though it does not treat in much depth his ecclesiastical ambitions or wider public career. Bartlett emphasises the tension between Gerald's Norman and Welsh ancestry and compares him to Jonathan Swift, whose Irish and English background likewise left him fully accepted by neither side.

The second part, divided into the chapters "Miracles and Marvels" and "Natural Science", deals with Gerald's treatment of the natural and supernatural. It discusses his use of miracles, which Bartlett treated as expressions of retributive justice.

The third part, "Ethnography", deals with Gerald's ethnographic writing. Bartlett argued that this writing was Gerald's most durable intellectual achievement, and Richard W. Pfaff described the section as the book's most ambitious part. Bartlett compared Gerald with two German contemporaries, Adam of Bremen and Helmold of Bosau, arguing that their attitudes toward the native peoples they encountered were similar.

The work concludes with an appendix containing the first complete printing of Gerald's poem on Prince Louis's invasion of England, a chronology of Gerald's works, a list of their manuscripts, and a "fairly full" bibliography.

== Publication history ==
The work was first published in 1982 by Clarendon Press. In 2006 a revised edition with the title Gerald of Wales: A Voice of the Middle Ages was published by Tempus Publishing.

== Reception ==
The work was well received. Pfaff wrote that the book gave a "fuller account of Gerald's life than we have hitherto possessed", and Roger Ray called it the "first far-reaching book" on Gerald. J. R. S. Phillips, Robert T. Meyer, and Antonia Gransden also reviewed it positively.

Edmund Fryde was more qualified in his assessment, writing that although the work had "deepened our understanding" of Gerald, it also contained several inaccuracies. He objected to Bartlett's statement that by 1280 only a few treatises by the Ancient Greeks and their Arab commentators remained to be translated, calling this "quite untrue" for large areas of Greek mathematics, astronomy, and medicine. He also faulted the book for not noting that Gerald's passage on depopulating Wales appeared only in the 1194 version of Descriptio Cambriae and was omitted from the c. 1215 version.

== See also ==
- Instruction for a Ruler, Bartlett's critical edition and parallel text English translation of Gerald's De principis instructione
