= Richard Plantagenet =

Richard Plantagenet may refer to any Richard who was a descendant of Geoffrey Plantagenet, Count of Anjou:

- Richard I of England (1157–1199), also known as Richard the Lionheart, third son of King Henry II of England
- Richard, 1st Earl of Cornwall (1209–1272), second son of John of England and younger brother of Henry III of England
- Richard II of England (1367–1400), son of Edward, the Black Prince
- Richard Plantagenet, of York, of Conisburgh, 3rd Earl of Cambridge (1385-1415), father of Richard Plantagenet, 3rd Duke of York.
- Richard Plantagenet, 3rd Duke of York (1411–1460), father of Edward IV and Richard III of England
- Richard III of England (1452–1485), the last Plantagenet king.
- Richard Plantagenet (Richard of Eastwell) (1469–1550), possible illegitimate son of Richard III of England
- Richard of Shrewsbury, 1st Duke of York (1473–1483), second son of Edward IV of England and younger brother of Edward V of England
  - His imposter, Perkin Warbeck (1474-1499)
- Richard Plantagenet (1476–1477), youngest child of George Plantagenet, 1st Duke of Clarence
- Richard Plantagenet Temple-Nugent-Brydges-Chandos-Grenville, 2nd Duke of Buckingham and Chandos (1797-1861), politician.
- Richard Plantagenet Campbell Temple-Nugent-Brydges-Chandos-Grenville, 3rd Duke of Buckingham and Chandos (1823-1889), politician and son of the 2nd Duke.
