= 1950 Swiss referendums =

Five referendums were held in Switzerland during 1950. The first was held on 29 January on extending a federal resolution on promoting housebuilding, and was rejected by voters. The second was held on 4 June on the federal budget, and was also rejected by voters. The third was held on 1 October on a popular initiative "for the protection of ground and labour by prohibiting speculation", and was rejected by voters. The final two were held on 3 December on revising article 72 of the constitution regarding the election of the National Council and a federal resolution on financial order between 1951 and 1954. Both were approved by voters.

== Background ==
The January referendum was an optional referendum, and required only a majority of votes in favour. The other four referendums all required double majorities; a majority of the popular vote and majority of the cantons. The decision of each canton was based on the vote in that canton. Full cantons counted as one vote, whilst half cantons counted as half.

== Results ==
=== January: Extending the federal resolution on housebuilding ===
Choice	Votes	%
For	333,878	46.3
Against	387,456	53.7
Blank votes	14,015	–
Invalid votes	1,418	–
Total	736,767	100
Registered voters/turnout	1,394,970	52.8
Source: Nohlen & Stöver

=== June: Federal budget ===
Choice	Popular vote		Cantons		
Choice	Votes	%	Full	Half	Total
For	267,770	35.5	5	2	6
Against	486,381	64.5	14	4	16
Blank votes	15,769	–	–	–	–
Invalid votes	1,202	–	–	–	–
Total	771,122	100	19	6	22
Registered voters/turnout	1,393,317	55.3	–	–	–
Source: Nohlen & Stöver

=== October: popular initiative banning speculation ===
Choice	Popular vote		Cantons		
Choice	Votes	%	Full	Half	Total
For	158,794	27.0	0	0	0
Against	429,091	73.0	19	6	22
Blank votes	22,607	–	–	–	–
Invalid votes	1,311	–	–	–	–
Total	611,803	100	19	6	22
Registered voters/turnout	1,400,891	43.7	–	–	–
Source: Nohlen & Stöver

=== December: Constitutional amendment ===
Choice	Popular vote		Cantons		
Choice	Votes	%	Full	Half	Total
For	450,395	67.3	17	6	20
Against	218,541	32.7	2	0	2
Blank votes	110,615	–	–	–	–
Invalid votes	2,140	–	–	–	–
Total	781,691	100	19	6	22
Registered voters/turnout	1,403,731	55.7	–	–	–
Source: Nohlen & Stöver

=== December: Financial order ===
Choice	Popular vote		Cantons		
Choice	Votes	%	Full	Half	Total
For	516,704	69.5	17	6	20
Against	227,131	30.5	2	0	2
Blank votes	35,884	–	–	–	–
Invalid votes	1,989	–	–	–	–
Total	781,708	100	19	6	22
Registered voters/turnout	1,403,731	55.7	–	–	–
Source: Nohlen & Stöver
