= Edward Plantagenet =

Edward Plantagenet may refer to:

Kings:

- Edward I (1239–1307), popularly known as Longshanks, reigned from 1272 until his death
- Edward II (1284–1327), reigned from 1307 until he was deposed in January 1327, and was murdered in September
- Edward III (1312–1377), crowned at the age of 14, and one of the more successful English monarchs of the Middle Ages
- Edward IV (1442–1483), reigned from 1461 to 1470, and again from 1471
- Edward V (1470–1483), king for two months in 1483 until deposed and sent to the Tower

Other:

- Edward of Middleham, Prince of Wales (1473–1484), only son of King Richard III of England
- Edward of Norwich, 2nd Duke of York (c. 1373–1415), grandson of Edward III
- Edward of Westminster, Prince of Wales (1453–1471), son of King Henry VI of England
- Edward the Black Prince (1330–1376), Prince of Wales, son of Edward III, known during his lifetime as Edward of Woodstock
- Edward Plantagenet, 17th Earl of Warwick (1475–1499), son of George Plantagenet, Duke of Clarence, himself son of Richard of York, 3rd Duke of York
