= The Plantagenets =

- Directed by: Jamie Simpson
- Presented by: Robert Bartlett
- Composers: Kirsten Morrison; Tony Royden
- Country of origin: United Kingdom
- Original language: English
- No. of seasons: 1
- No. of episodes: 3

Production
- Executive producer: Chris Granlund
- Producer: Jamie Simpson

Original release
- Network: BBC Two
- Release: 17 March – 31 March 2014

The Plantagenets is a 2014 television documentary series on the House of Plantagenet, which ruled England from 1154 to 1485. The series first aired from 17 March to 31 March 2014 on BBC Two and was presented by historian Robert Bartlett.

== Summary ==
Bartlett, a historian and professor, examines the history of the House of Plantagenet, England's longest-ruling dynasty. While the names and stories of the Tudors are well known in popular culture, less is known about the Plantagenets, says Bartlett, who describes them as a "fascinating but ferocious dynasty."

== Episodes ==
Episode #	Episode Title	Summary	Original airdate
1	"The Devil's Brood"	The story of the Plantagenets begins with Geoffrey, Count of Anjou, whose son Henry II establishes an empire that spans across England and much of France. His sons, Richard the Lionheart and John, betray each other and nearly destroy the dynasty as a result.	17 March 2014
2	"An English Empire"	The Plantagenets try to expand their power across the British Isles and win back their French land. English nationality emerges.	24 March 2014
3	"The Death of Kings"	Four Plantagenet kings are betrayed and murdered by members of their own family, while civil war breaks out across Britain.	31 March 2014
