= Geoffrey Plantagenet =

Geoffrey Plantagenet may refer to:

- Geoffrey Plantagenet, Count of Anjou (1113–1151), Count of Anjou, father of Henry II of England and the first to be known as Plantagenet
- Geoffrey (archbishop of York) (1151–1212), Archbishop of York, illegitimate son of Henry II
- Geoffrey II, Duke of Brittany (1158–1186), Duke of Brittany, third surviving legitimate son of Henry II
