= Edmund Plantagenet =

Edmund Plantagenet may refer to:

- Edmund, Earl of Rutland (1443–1460), son of Richard, Duke of York
- Edmund of Woodstock, 1st Earl of Kent (1301–1330)
- Edmund, 2nd Earl of Kent
- Edmund Crouchback, 1st Earl of Leicester and Lancaster, Crusader, son of King Henry III of England
- Prince Edmund (Blackadder), Prince Edmund Plantagenet, the main character of the first series of Blackadder
