= Joan of England =

Joan of England may refer to:

- Joan of England, Queen of Sicily (1165–1199), daughter of Henry II of England; married William II of Sicily
- Joan, Lady of Wales (1191–1237), illegitimate daughter of John, King of England; married Llywelyn the Great of Gwynedd
- Joan of England, Queen Consort of Scotland (1210–1238), third child and eldest daughter of John, King of England and Isabella of Angoulême; married Alexander II of Scotland
- Joan of England, Countess of Gloucester (1272–1307), known as Joan of Acre, daughter of Edward I of England
- Joan of the Tower (1321–1362), second daughter and youngest child of Edward II of England and Isabella of France; married David II of Scotland
- Joan of England (born 1333 or 1334; died 1348), youngest daughter of Edward III of England and Philippa of Hainault
- Joan of Kent (born 1326 or 1327, died 1385), the "Fair Maid of Kent", mother of Richard II of England
