= Elizabeth Plantagenet =

Elizabeth Plantagenet may refer to:

By birth

- Elizabeth of Lancaster, Duchess of Exeter (1364 - 1426), third child of John of Gaunt
- Elizabeth of York, eldest daughter of Edward IV and wife of Henry VII
- Elizabeth of York, Duchess of Suffolk, sister of Edward IV
- Elizabeth of Rhuddlan, daughter of Edward I of England, wife of John I, Count of Holland and then of Humphrey de Bohun, 4th Earl of Hereford

By marriage

- Elizabeth Woodville, queen consort of Edward IV.
