= Mirabile illud =

1950 papal encyclical by Pius XII

Mirabile illud Encyclical of Pope Pius XII
- Signature date: 6 December 1950
- Number: 19 of the pontificate

Mirabile illud is an encyclical of Pope Pius XII on the crusade of prayer for peace, given at Rome from St. Peter's on 6 December 1950, the twelfth year of his Pontificate.

The Pope is concerned about imminent war spreading from Korea to the world. Bloody conflicts bring in their wake untold ruins, slaughter and misery of every kind. He exhorts all to put aside animosities and differences and introduce that true peace. But, because human efforts are incapable of achieving such results, he institutes a prayer crusade for the whole Church.

The faithful should unite with the Pope via radio at midnight of the feast of the Immaculate Conception of the Blessed Virgin Mary. During the novena for Christmas and on Christmas night, all the faithful should be united with the Vicar of Jesus Christ, praying for should real and genuine peace to all nations and peoples.

Earnest prayers to the newborn Christ through His Blessed Mother should be made, so that the Catholic religion, "may enjoy due liberty in all nations and that those 'who suffer persecution for justice' sake' those who because of their courageous defense of the rights of the Holy Church are confined to prison, or are driven forth and banished from their homes, and those also who, exiled from their fatherlands, wander about in wretchedness or still languish in captivity, may receive heavenly consolations and be granted at length that good fortune which they have been awaiting with such burning desire and ardent longing."

The Pontiff offers his apostolic blessing as a pledge of his paternal benevolence be to each and all who pray in accordance with these intentions, a source of heavenly graces.
