= Robert Bartlett (historian) =

20th and 21st-century British historian of the Middle Ages

Robert John Bartlett (born 27 November 1950) is an English historian and medievalist. He is Bishop Wardlaw Professor of Medieval History Emeritus at the University of St Andrews.

Bartlett was born in Streatham. After attending Battersea Grammar School in London (1962 to 1969), he studied at Peterhouse, Cambridge, St John's College, Oxford and Princeton University as a Jane Eliza Procter Visiting Fellow. He obtained research fellowships at several institutions, including the University of Michigan and University of Göttingen, before working at the University of Edinburgh, the University of Chicago and the University of St Andrews, where he currently resides.

Bartlett is particularly known for his work The Making of Europe: Conquest, Colonization and Cultural Change, 950-1350, which won the Wolfson History Prize in 1993. He specializes in medieval colonialism, the cult of saints, and England between the 11th century and the 14th century. He gave the 2007 Ford Lectures at the University of Oxford. He wrote and presented Inside The Medieval Mind, a four-part documentary broadcast by the BBC in 2008 as part of a medieval season.

In 2010, Bartlett wrote and presented The Normans on the BBC, a documentary series about their wide-ranging impact on Britain, countries of the Mediterranean and as far afield as the Holy Land. In 2014, he presented the BBC documentary series The Plantagenets, about the eponymous royal dynasty.

== Select bibliography ==
- Gerald of Wales, 1146-1223, (Oxford, 1982)
- Trial by fire and water : the medieval judicial ordeal (Oxford, 1986)
- (ed. with Angus MacKay) Medieval frontier societies
- The Making of Europe: Conquest, Colonization and Cultural Change, 950-1350 (London, 1993)
- England Under the Norman and Angevin Kings, (Oxford, 2000)
- Medieval and Modern Concepts of Race and Ethnicity (Scotland 2001) Published in Journal of Medieval and Early Modern Studies 31:1, Winter 2001
- (ed.& tr.) Life and miracles of St Modwenna, (Oxford, 2002, ISBN 978-0198206064)
- (ed.& tr.) The miracles of Saint Æbbe of Coldingham and Saint Margaret of Scotland, (Oxford, 2003, ISBN 978-0199259229)
- The Hanged Man: A Story of Miracle, Memory and Colonialism in the Middle Ages, (Princeton, 2005, ISBN 978-0691117195)
- Gerald of Wales: A Voice of the Middle Ages, (Tempus, 2006, ISBN 978-0752440316) [revised edition of Gerald of Wales, 1146-1223]
- The Natural and the Supernatural in the Middle Ages (The Wiles Lectures), (Cambridge University Press, 2008, ISBN 978-0521878326)
- Why Can the Dead Do Such Great Things?: Saints and Worshippers from the Martyrs to the Reformation, (Princeton University Press, 2013, ISBN 978-0691159133)
- (ed.& tr.) Instruction for a Ruler (Oxford University Press, 2018, ISBN 978-0-19-873862-6)
- Blood Royal: Dynastic Politics in Medieval Europe, (Cambridge University Press, 2020, ISBN 978-1-108-49067-2)
- The Middle Ages and the Movies: Eight Key Films, (Reaktion Books, 2022, ISBN 178914552X)
- (ed.& tr.) The History of Llanthony Priory (Oxford University Press, 2022, ISBN 978-0-19-286649-3)
- History in Flames: The Destruction and Survival of Medieval Manuscripts, (Cambridge University Press, 2024, ISBN 978-1-009-45715-6)
- Richard the Lionheart: Crusader King of England, (Amberley Books, 2018, ISBN 9781445662701, https://www.amberley-books.com/discover-books/richard-the-lionheart-9781445689470.html)
