= Margaret Plantagenet =

Margaret Plantagenet may refer to:

- Margaret of England (1240–1275), Queen of Scotland
- Margaret of England (1275–1333), Duchess of Brabant
- Margaret, Duchess of Norfolk (c. 1320–1399), heiress of Thomas of Brotherton; sometimes surnamed Brotherton or Marshal
- Margaret, Countess of Pembroke (1346–1361), daughter of Edward III
- Margaret of York (1446 – 1503), Duchess of Burgundy, sister of Edward IV and Richard III
- Margaret of York (1472) (10 April 1472 – 11 December 1472), daughter of Edward IV
- Margaret Pole, 8th Countess of Salisbury (1473–1541), niece of Edward IV and Richard III
