= Catherine Plantagenet =

Catherine Plantagenet may refer to:

- Katherine of England (1253–1257), daughter of Henry III of England
- Catherine of York (1479–1527), daughter of Edward IV of England
- Catherine of Lancaster (1373–1418), queen of Castile and daughter of John of Gaunt
- Lady Catherine Gordon (died 1537), wife of pretender Perkin Warbeck, who claimed to be Richard Plantagenet, Duke of York
- Katherine Plantagenet, Countess of Pembroke, illegitimate daughter of Richard III and second wife of William Herbert, 2nd Earl of Pembroke
