= Humphrey Plantagenet =

Humphrey Plantagenet may refer to:

- Humphrey of Lancaster, 1st Duke of Gloucester (1390–1447)
- Humphrey, 2nd Earl of Buckingham (1381–1399)
