= Eleanor Plantagenet =

Eleanor Plantagenet may refer to:

- Eleanor of Lancaster (1318–1372), wife of John de Beaumont and Richard Fitz Alan
- Eleanor, Fair Maid of Brittany (c. 1184–1241), daughter of Duke Geoffrey II of Brittany
- Eleanor of England, Countess of Leicester (1215–1275), daughter of John, King of England and wife of William Marshall and Simon de Montfort

== See also ==
- Eleanor of England (disambiguation)
