= Oxford Medieval Texts =

- Original title: Medieval Texts
- Country: United Kingdom
- Language: English
- Discipline: Medieval studies
- Publisher: Oxford University Press
- Published: 1953–1965; 1967–
- Media type: Print / Digital
- OCLC: 713874399
- Website: https://global.oup.com/academic/content/series/o/oxford-medieval-texts-omt/

Oxford Medieval Texts (OMT), published by Oxford University Press, is a series of critical editions and translations of primary sources written during the Middle Ages. Focusing on works written in medieval Latin, it provides authoritative and accessible editions for medieval history, literature, theology, and intellectual life. Its equivalent for the ancient world is Oxford Classical Texts.

== Scope and purpose ==
The series focuses on works written between late antiquity and the end of the Middle Ages, including Latin and vernacular texts from Western Europe. Its objective is to make authoritative versions of important texts accessible to both specialists and general readers. Each volume situates texts within their historical, cultural, and intellectual context, providing tools for a nuanced understanding of medieval thought and society.

== History ==
The Oxford Medieval Texts series emerged from earlier British scholarly endeavours aimed at publishing critical editions of medieval sources. It began as the Medieval Texts series, published between 1953 and 1965 by Thomas Nelson, often known as Nelson's Medieval Texts. The Oxford series took on the Nelson titles and format.

The Nelson series was a continuation of the editorial ethos established by the monumental Rolls Series. This collection, initiated under the direction of the British Master of the Rolls, aimed to publish authoritative editions of medieval British historical sources.

Medieval Texts refined the Rolls Series model by producing more accessible editions that incorporate facing-page translations and introductory materials to contextualize the works, combined with a more rigorous approach to textual criticism. Oxford University Press relaunched the series as Oxford Medieval Texts in 1967.

== Format ==
A typical volume in the series includes:

- An introduction covering the author, context, manuscript tradition, and editorial principles
- A Latin text based on a critical comparison of manuscript sources
- A facing-page English translation in modern prose style
- A critical apparatus using selective notation to track significant variants
- Extensive explanatory and historical notes
- Concordances with previous editions, where appropriate
- Full bibliography and indices of manuscripts, biblical citations, classical and medieval sources, and general subjects

Oxford University Press makes the full series available in print and digitally through Oxford Scholarly Editions Online.

== See also ==
- Corpus Christianorum
- Patrologia Latina
- Monumenta Germaniae Historica
