= December 4 =

December 4 this year in various calendars
- Friday, 4 December 2026
Akan	Kurufie
Armenian	17 Kʿaloch 1476
Aztec	Tozoztontli 3, 4 Cōzcacuāuhtli
Babylonian	23 Arakhsamna, 2337 SE
Balinese pawukon	Menga, Pasah, Laba, Keliwon, Paniron, Sukra of Taulu, Indra, Nohan, Sri
Bengali	19 Ogrohayon, BS 1433
Chinese	Yang Water Rat・Ghost Mansion; Fire Horse Year, Month 10, Day 26 (Xiaoxue, 3 days until Daxue)
Common Era	4 December 2026 CE
Coptic	25 Hathor, AM 1743
Egyptian	22 Pharmuthi, 2775 NE
Ethiopian	25 H̱edār, 2019 Amätä Məhrät
French Republican	Décade II, Tridi de Frimaire de l'Année 235 de la République
Gregorian	4 December, AD 2026
Hebrew	24 Kislev, AM 5787
Hindu	Hasta・Ayuṣmān; Solar: 18 Mārgaśīrṣa, 1948 SE; Lunisolar: Ekādaśī, Kṛishna pakṣa of Kārtika, 2083 VE; Rāudra・5127 KY・1,872,913
Icelandic	Föstudagur, 12 Ýlir 2026
Islamic	23 Jumada al-thani, AH 1448 (using tabular method)
ISO week date	2026-W49-5
Japanese	26 Kannazuki, Reiwa 8 (Shōsetsu, 3 days until Taisetsu)
Julian	21 November, AD 2026 (AM 7535)
Julian day	2461379
Korean	26 Dwaejidal, 4359 DE
Maya	13.0.14.2.16; 9 Mac, 4 Cib
Roman	ante diem XI Kalendas Decembres, MMDCCLXXIX AUC
Solar Hijri	13 Azar, SH 1405
Tibetan	26 smin drug, me pho rta 2153 or 1772 or 1000

<<	December					>>
Su	Mo	Tu	We	Th	Fr	Sa
		1	2	3	4	5
6	7	8	9	10	11	12
13	14	15	16	17	18	19
20	21	22	23	24	25	26
27	28	29	30	31
2026

December 4 in recent years
2025 (Thursday)
2024 (Wednesday)
2023 (Monday)
2022 (Sunday)
2021 (Saturday)
2020 (Friday)
2019 (Wednesday)
2018 (Tuesday)
2017 (Monday)
2016 (Sunday)

December 4 is the 338th day of the year (339th in leap years) in the Gregorian calendar; 27 days remain until the end of the year.

== Events ==
=== Pre-1600 ===
- 771 – Austrasian king Carloman I dies, leaving his brother Charlemagne as sole king of the Frankish Kingdom.
- 963 – The lay papal protonotary is elected pope and takes the name Leo VIII, being consecrated on 6 December after ordination.
- 1110 – An army led by Baldwin I of Jerusalem and Sigurd the Crusader of Norway captures Sidon at the end of the First Crusade.
- 1259 – Kings Louis IX of France and Henry III of England agree to the Treaty of Paris, in which Henry renounces his claims to French-controlled territory on continental Europe (including Normandy) in exchange for Louis withdrawing his support for English rebels.
- 1563 – The final session of the Council of Trent is held nearly 18 years after the body held its first session on December 13, 1545.

=== 1601–1900 ===
- 1619 – Thirty-eight colonists arrive at Berkeley Hundred, Virginia. The group's charter proclaims that the day "be yearly and perpetually kept holy as a day of thanksgiving to Almighty God."
- 1623 – 50 Christians are executed in Edo, Japan, during the Great Martyrdom of Edo.
- 1676 – The Battle of Lund occurs, and is the bloodiest battle in Scandinavian history.
- 1745 – Charles Edward Stuart's army reaches Derby, its furthest point during the Second Jacobite Rising.
- 1783 – At Fraunces Tavern in New York City, U.S. General George Washington bids farewell to his officers.
- 1786 – Mission Santa Barbara is dedicated (on the feast day of Saint Barbara).
- 1791 – The first edition of The Observer, the world's first Sunday newspaper, is published.
- 1804 – The United States House of Representatives adopts articles of impeachment against Supreme Court Justice Samuel Chase.
- 1808 – Napoleonic Wars: Under the orders by commander Tomás de Morla, the city of Madrid surrenders to French Emperor Napoleon I after a 4 day long siege.
- 1829 – In the face of fierce local opposition, British Governor-General Lord William Bentinck issues a regulation declaring that anyone who abets sati in Bengal is guilty of culpable homicide.
- 1861 – American Civil War: The 109 electors of the several states of the Confederate States of America unanimously elect Jefferson Davis as President and Alexander H. Stephens as Vice President.
- 1863 – American Civil War: Confederate General James Longstreet lifts his unsuccessful siege of Knoxville, Tennessee after failing to capture the city.
- 1864 – American Civil War: Sherman's March to the Sea: Union cavalry forces defeat Confederate cavalry in the Battle of Waynesboro, Georgia, opening the way for General William T. Sherman's army to approach the coast.
- 1865 – North Carolina ratifies 13th Amendment to the U.S. Constitution, followed two days later by Georgia, and U.S. slaves were legally free within two weeks.
- 1867 – Former Minnesota farmer Oliver Hudson Kelley founds the Order of the Patrons of Husbandry (better known today as the Grange).
- 1872 – The American brigantine Mary Celeste is discovered drifting in the Atlantic. Her crew is never found.
- 1875 – Notorious New York City politician Boss Tweed escapes from prison; he is later recaptured in Spain.
- 1881 – The first edition of the Los Angeles Times is published.
- 1893 – First Matabele War: A patrol of 34 British South Africa Company soldiers is ambushed and annihilated by more than 3,000 Matabele warriors on the Shangani River in Matabeleland.

=== 1901–present ===
- 1906 – Alpha Phi Alpha, the first intercollegiate Greek lettered fraternity for African-Americans, was founded at Cornell University in Ithaca, New York.
- 1909 – In Canadian football, the First Grey Cup game is played. The University of Toronto Varsity Blues defeat the Toronto Parkdale Canoe Club, 26–6.
- 1909 – The Montreal Canadiens ice hockey club, the oldest surviving professional hockey franchise in the world, is founded as a charter member of the National Hockey Association.
- 1917 – The Finnish Senate submits to the Parliament of Finland a proposal for the form of government of the Republic of Finland and issues a communication to Parliament declaring the independence of Finland.
- 1918 – U.S. President Woodrow Wilson sails for the World War I peace talks in Versailles, becoming the first US president to travel to Europe while in office.
- 1919 – Ukrainian War of Independence: The Polonsky conspiracy is initiated, with an attempt to assassinate the high command of the Revolutionary Insurgent Army of Ukraine.
- 1928 – Cosmo Gordon Lang was enthroned as the Archbishop of Canterbury, the first bachelor to be appointed in 150 years.
- 1939 – World War II: HMS Nelson is struck by a mine (laid by U-31) off the Scottish coast and is laid up for repairs until August 1940.
- 1942 – World War II: Carlson's patrol during the Guadalcanal campaign ends.
- 1943 – World War II: In Yugoslavia, resistance leader Marshal Josip Broz Tito proclaims a provisional democratic Yugoslav government in-exile.
- 1943 – World War II: U.S. President Franklin D. Roosevelt closes down the Works Progress Administration, because of the high levels of wartime employment in the United States.
- 1945 – By a vote of 65–7, the United States Senate approves United States participation in the United Nations. (The UN had been established on October 24, 1945.)
- 1948 – Chinese Civil War: The SS Kiangya, carrying Nationalist refugees from Shanghai, explodes in the Huangpu River.
- 1949 – Sir Duncan George Stewart, governor of the Crown Colony of Sarawak, was fatally stabbed by a member of the Rukun 13.
- 1950 – Korean War: Jesse L. Brown (the 1st African-American Naval aviator) is killed in action during the Battle of Chosin Reservoir.
- 1950 – Korean War: Associated Press photographer Max Desfor photographs hundreds of Korean refugees crossing a downed bridge in the Taedong River: 1951 Pulitzer Prize winner Flight of Refugees Across Wrecked Bridge in Korea.
- 1956 – The Million Dollar Quartet (Elvis Presley, Jerry Lee Lewis, Carl Perkins, and Johnny Cash) get together at Sun Studio for the first and last time.
- 1964 – Free Speech Movement: Police arrest over 800 students at the University of California, Berkeley, following their takeover and sit-in at the administration building in protest of the UC Regents' decision to forbid protests on UC property.
- 1965 – Launch of Gemini 7 with crew members Frank Borman and Jim Lovell. The Gemini 7 spacecraft was the passive target for the first crewed space rendezvous performed by the crew of Gemini 6A.
- 1969 – Black Panther Party members Fred Hampton and Mark Clark are shot and killed during a raid by 14 Chicago police officers.
- 1971 – The PNS Ghazi, a Pakistan Navy submarine, sinks during the course of the Indo-Pakistani Naval War of 1971.
- 1971 – During a concert by Frank Zappa and The Mothers of Invention at the Montreux Casino, an audience member fires a flare gun into the ceiling, causing a fire that destroys the venue. The incident served as the inspiration for Deep Purple's 1973 song Smoke on the Water.
- 1974 – Martinair Flight 138 crashes into the Saptha Kanya mountain range in Maskeliya, Sri Lanka, killing 191.
- 1977 – Jean-Bédel Bokassa, president of the Central African Republic, crowns himself Emperor Bokassa I of the Central African Empire.
- 1977 – Malaysian Airline System Flight 653 is hijacked and crashes in Tanjong Kupang, Johor, killing 100.
- 1978 – Following the murder of Mayor George Moscone, Dianne Feinstein becomes San Francisco's first female mayor.
- 1979 – The Hastie fire in Hull kills three schoolboys and eventually leads police to arrest Bruce George Peter Lee.
- 1981 – South Africa grants independence to the Ciskei "homeland" (not recognized by any government outside South Africa).
- 1982 – The China adopts its current constitution.
- 1983 – US Navy aircraft from USS John F. Kennedy and USS Independence attack Syrian missile sites in Lebanon in response to an F-14 being fired on by an SA-7. One A-6 Intruder and A-7 Corsair are shot down. One American pilot is killed, one is rescued, and one is captured.
- 1984 – Sri Lankan Civil War: Sri Lankan Army soldiers kill 107–150 civilians in Mannar.
- 1986 – The MV Amazon Venture oil tanker begins leaking oil while at the port of Savannah in the United States, resulting in an oil spill of approximately 500,000 US gallons (1,900,000 L).
- 1991 – Terry A. Anderson is released after seven years in captivity as a hostage in Beirut; he is the last and longest-held American hostage in Lebanon.
- 1991 – Pan American World Airways ceases its operations after 64 years.
- 1992 – Somali Civil War: President George H. W. Bush orders 28,000 U.S. troops to Somalia in Northeast Africa.
- 1996 – Journalists Fernando Balderas Sánchez and Yolanda Figueroa and their three children are murdered in a case that initially prompted speculation about links to organized crime, corruption, or their journalistic work.
- 1998 – The Unity Module, the second module of the International Space Station, is launched.
- 2005 – Tens of thousands of people in Hong Kong protest for democracy and call on the government to allow universal and equal suffrage.
- 2006 – Six black youths assault a white teenager in Jena, Louisiana.
- 2014 – Islamic insurgents kill three state police at a traffic circle before taking an empty school and a "press house" in Grozny. Ten state forces die with 28 injured in gun battles ending with ten insurgents killed.
- 2015 – A firebomb is thrown into a restaurant in the Egyptian capital of Cairo, killing 17 people.
- 2017 – The Thomas Fire starts near Santa Paula in California. It eventually became the largest wildfire in modern California history to date after burning 1,140 square kilometers (440 sq mi) in Ventura and Santa Barbara Counties.
- 2021 – Semeru on the Indonesian island of Java erupts, killing at least 68 people.
- 2024 – UnitedHealthcare CEO Brian Thompson is shot and killed in Manhattan, New York City near the entrance of the New York Hilton Midtown.
- 2025 – Yasser Abu Shabab is assassinated near Rafah, Gaza Strip.

== Births ==
=== Pre-1600 ===
- AD 34 – Persius, Roman poet (died 62)
- 846 – Hasan al-Askari 11th Imam of Twelver Shia Islam (died 874)
- 1428 – Bernard VII, Lord of Lippe (died 1511)
- 1506 – Thomas Darcy, 1st Baron Darcy of Chiche (died 1558)
- 1555 – Heinrich Meibom, German poet and historian (died 1625)
- 1575 – Sister Virginia Maria, Italian nun (died 1650)
- 1580 – Samuel Argall, English adventurer and naval officer (died 1626)
- 1585 – John Cotton, English-American minister and theologian (died 1652)
- 1595 – Jean Chapelain, French poet and critic (died 1674)

=== 1601–1900 ===
- 1647 – Daniel Eberlin, German composer (died 1715)
- 1660 – André Campra, French composer and conductor (died 1744)
- 1667 – Michel Pignolet de Montéclair, French composer and educator (died 1737)
- 1670 – John Aislabie, English politician, Chancellor of the Exchequer (died 1742)
- 1713 – Gasparo Gozzi, Italian playwright and critic (died 1786)
- 1727 – Johann Gottfried Zinn, German anatomist and botanist (died 1759)
- 1777 – Juliette Récamier, French businesswoman (died 1849)
- 1795 – Thomas Carlyle, Scottish-English historian, philosopher, and academic (died 1881)
- 1798 – Jules Armand Dufaure, French lawyer and politician, 33rd Prime Minister of France (died 1881)
- 1817 – Nikoloz Baratashvili, Georgian poet and author (died 1845)
- 1835 – Samuel Butler, English author and critic (died 1902)
- 1844 – Franz Xavier Wernz, German religious leader, 25th Superior General of the Society of Jesus (died 1914)
- 1861 – Hannes Hafstein, Icelandic poet and politician, 1st Prime Minister of Iceland (died 1922)
- 1865 – Edith Cavell, English nurse, humanitarian, and saint (Anglicanism) (died 1915)
- 1867 – Stanley Argyle, Australian politician, 32nd Premier of Victoria (died 1940)
- 1868 – Jesse Burkett, American baseball player, coach, and manager (died 1953)
- 1875 – Agnes Forbes Blackadder, Scottish medical doctor (died 1964)
- 1875 – Joe Corbett, American baseball player and coach (died 1945)
- 1875 – Rainer Maria Rilke, Austrian-Swiss poet and author (died 1926)
- 1877 – Morris Alexander, South African politician (died 1946)
- 1881 – Erwin von Witzleben, Polish-German field marshal (died 1944)
- 1882 – Constance Davey, Australian psychologist (died 1963)
- 1883 – Katharine Susannah Prichard, Australian author and playwright (died 1969)
- 1884 – R. C. Majumdar, Indian historian (died 1980)
- 1887 – Winifred Carney, Irish suffragist, trade unionist, and Irish republican (died 1943)
- 1892 – Francisco Franco, Spanish general and dictator, Prime Minister of Spain (died 1975)
- 1892 – Liu Bocheng, Chinese commander and politician (died 1986)
- 1893 – Herbert Read, English poet and critic (died 1968)
- 1895 – Feng Youlan, Chinese philosopher and academic (died 1990)
- 1897 – Robert Redfield, American anthropologist of Mexico (died 1958)
- 1899 – Karl-Günther Heimsoth, German physician and politician (died 1934)
- 1899 – Charlie Spencer, English footballer and manager (died 1953)

=== 1901–present ===
- 1903 – Cornell Woolrich, American author (died 1968)
- 1904 – Albert Norden, German journalist and politician (died 1982)
- 1908 – Alfred Hershey, American bacteriologist and geneticist, Nobel Prize laureate (died 1997)
- 1910 – Alex North, American composer and conductor (died 1991)
- 1910 – R. Venkataraman, Indian lawyer and politician, 6th President of India (died 2009)
- 1912 – Pappy Boyington, American colonel and pilot, Medal of Honor recipient (died 1988)
- 1913 – Mark Robson, Canadian-American director and producer (died 1978)
- 1914 – Rudolf Hausner, Austrian painter and sculptor (died 1995)
- 1914 – Claude Renoir, French cinematographer (died 1993)
- 1915 – Eddie Heywood, American pianist and composer (died 1989)
- 1916 – Ely Jacques Kahn Jr., American journalist and author (died 1994)
- 1919 – I. K. Gujral, Indian poet and politician, 12th Prime Minister of India (died 2012)
- 1920 – Nadir Afonso, Portuguese painter and architect (died 2013)
- 1920 – Michael Bates, English actor (died 1978)
- 1920 – Jeanne Manford, American educator and activist, co-founded PFLAG (died 2013)
- 1921 – Deanna Durbin, Canadian actress and singer (died 2013)
- 1923 – Charles Keating, American lawyer and financier (died 2014)
- 1923 – Eagle Keys, American-Canadian football player and coach (died 2012)
- 1923 – John Krish, English director and screenwriter (died 2016)
- 1924 – John C. Portman Jr., American architect, designed the Renaissance Center and Tomorrow Square (died 2017)
- 1925 – Albert Bandura, Canadian-American psychologist and academic (died 2021)
- 1926 – Ned Romero, American actor and opera singer (died 2017)
- 1929 – Şakir Eczacıbaşı, Turkish pharmacist, photographer, and businessman (died 2010)
- 1930 – Ronnie Corbett, Scottish actor and comedian (died 2016)
- 1930 – Jim Hall, American guitarist and composer (died 2013)
- 1931 – Alex Delvecchio, Canadian ice hockey player, coach, and manager (died 2025)
- 1931 – Wally George, American radio and television host (died 2003)
- 1932 – Roh Tae-woo, South Korean general and politician, 6th President of South Korea (died 2021)
- 1933 – Horst Buchholz, German actor (died 2003)
- 1933 – Wink Martindale, American game show host and producer (died 2025)
- 1933 – Dick Ricketts, American baseball and basketball player (died 1988)
- 1934 – Bill Collins, Australian film critic and author (died 2019)
- 1934 – Victor French, American actor and director (died 1989)
- 1935 – Paul O'Neill, American businessman and politician, 72nd United States Secretary of the Treasury (died 2020)
- 1936 – Freddy Cannon, American singer and guitarist
- 1936 – John Giorno, American poet and performance artist (died 2019)
- 1937 – Max Baer Jr., American actor, director, and producer
- 1938 – Andre Marrou, American lawyer and politician
- 1938 – Yvonne Minton, Australian-English soprano and actress
- 1939 – Stephen W. Bosworth, American academic and diplomat, United States Ambassador to South Korea (died 2016)
- 1939 – Joan Brady, American-British author (died 2024)
- 1940 – Gerd Achterberg, German footballer and manager
- 1940 – Gary Gilmore, American murderer (died 1977)
- 1941 – Marty Riessen, American tennis player and coach
- 1942 – Bob Mosley, American singer-songwriter and bass player
- 1944 – Chris Hillman, American singer-songwriter and guitarist
- 1944 – Anna McGarrigle, Canadian musician and singer-songwriter
- 1944 – François Migault, French race car driver (died 2012)
- 1944 – Dennis Wilson, American singer-songwriter, producer, and drummer (died 1983)
- 1945 – Roberta Bondar, Canadian neurologist, academic, and astronaut
- 1946 – Karina, Spanish singer/actress
- 1947 – Jane Lubchenco, American ecologist, academic, and diplomat
- 1948 – Southside Johnny, American singer-songwriter
- 1949 – Jeff Bridges, American actor
- 1949 – Jock Stirrup, Baron Stirrup, English air marshal and politician
- 1950 – Bjørn Kjellemyr, Norwegian bassist and composer (died 2025)
- 1951 – Gary Rossington, American guitarist (died 2023)
- 1951 – Patricia Wettig, American actress and playwright
- 1953 – Rick Middleton, Canadian ice hockey player and sportscaster
- 1953 – Jean-Marie Pfaff, Belgian footballer and manager
- 1954 – Tony Todd, American actor (died 2024)
- 1955 – Philip Hammond, English businessman and politician, former Chancellor of the Exchequer
- 1955 – Dave Taylor, Canadian-American ice hockey player and manager
- 1955 – Cassandra Wilson, American singer-songwriter and producer (died 2026)
- 1956 – Nia Griffith, Welsh educator and politician, former Shadow Secretary of State for Wales
- 1956 – Bernard King, American basketball player and sportscaster
- 1957 – Raul Boesel, Brazilian race car driver and radio host
- 1957 – Eric S. Raymond, American computer programmer and author
- 1957 – Lee Smith, American baseball player
- 1958 – Sergei Starikov, Russian ice hockey player and coach
- 1960 – David Green, Nicaraguan-American baseball player
- 1960 – Glynis Nunn, Australian heptathlete and hurler
- 1961 – Frank Reich, American football player and coach
- 1961 – Naomi Robson, American-Australian television host
- 1962 – Vinnie Dombroski, American singer-songwriter and musician
- 1962 – Gary Freeman, New Zealand rugby league player, coach, and sportscaster
- 1962 – Nixon Kiprotich, Kenyan runner
- 1962 – Kevin Richardson, English footballer and manager
- 1963 – Sergey Bubka, Ukrainian pole vaulter
- 1963 – Nigel Heslop, English rugby player
- 1964 – Scott Hastings, Scottish rugby player and sportscaster (died 2026)
- 1964 – Chelsea Noble, American actress
- 1964 – Marisa Tomei, American actress
- 1965 – Álex de la Iglesia, Spanish director, producer, and screenwriter
- 1965 – Shaun Hollamby, English race car driver and businessman
- 1965 – Ulf Kirsten, German footballer and manager
- 1966 – Fred Armisen, American actor and musician
- 1966 – Andy Hess, American bass player
- 1966 – Suzanne Malveaux, American journalist
- 1966 – Suzette M. Malveaux, American lawyer and academic
- 1967 – Guillermo Amor, Spanish footballer and manager
- 1968 – Tahir Dawar, Pakistani police officer and Pashto poet (died 2018)
- 1969 – Dionne Farris, American singer-songwriter, producer and actress
- 1969 – Jay-Z, American rapper, producer, actor, and co-founder of Roc-A-Fella Records
- 1969 – Plum Sykes, English journalist and author
- 1970 – Kevin Sussman, American actor and comedian
- 1971 – Shannon Briggs, American boxer and actor
- 1972 – Jassen Cullimore, Canadian ice hockey player
- 1972 – Yūko Miyamura, Japanese voice actress and singer
- 1973 – Tyra Banks, American model, actress, and producer
- 1973 – Mina Caputo, American singer-songwriter and keyboard player
- 1973 – Michael Jackson, English footballer and manager
- 1973 – Steven Menzies, Australian rugby league player
- 1973 – Kate Rusby, English singer-songwriter and guitarist
- 1973 – Corliss Williamson, American basketball player and coach
- 1974 – Tadahito Iguchi, Japanese baseball player
- 1976 – Kristina Groves, Canadian speed skater
- 1976 – Betty Lennox, American basketball player
- 1977 – Ajit Agarkar, Indian cricketer
- 1977 – Darvis Patton, American sprinter
- 1977 – Morten Veland, Norwegian guitarist and songwriter
- 1978 – Jaclyn Victor, Malaysian singer and actress
- 1979 – Ysabella Brave, American singer-songwriter
- 1979 – Jay DeMerit, American soccer player
- 1980 – Brian Cook, American basketball player
- 1980 – Viktor, Canadian wrestler and manager
- 1981 – Brian Vandborg, Danish cyclist
- 1982 – Nathan Douglas, English triple jumper
- 1982 – Waldo Ponce, Chilean footballer
- 1982 – Ho-Pin Tung, Dutch-Chinese race car driver
- 1982 – Nick Vujicic, Australian evangelist
- 1983 – Jimmy Bartel, Australian footballer
- 1983 – Chinx, American rapper (died 2015)
- 1984 – Lindsay Felton, American actress
- 1984 – Anna Petrakova, Russian basketball player
- 1984 – Jelly Roll, American singer and rapper
- 1984 – Joe Thomas, American football player
- 1985 – Andrew Brackman, American baseball player
- 1985 – Carlos Gómez, Dominican baseball player
- 1986 – Kaija Udras, Estonian skier
- 1986 – Martell Webster, American basketball player
- 1987 – Orlando Brown, American actor and rapper
- 1988 – Yeng Constantino, Filipina singer and songwriter
- 1990 – Lukman Haruna, Nigerian footballer
- 1990 – Blake Leary, Australian rugby league player
- 1991 – Duje Dukan, Croatian basketball player
- 1991 – André Roberson, American basketball player
- 1991 – Max Holloway, American mixed martial artist
- 1991 – Reality Winner, American intelligence specialist convicted of espionage
- 1992 – Robin Bruyère, Belgian politician
- 1992 – Peta Hiku, New Zealand rugby league player
- 1992 – Jean-Claude Iranzi, Rwandan footballer
- 1992 – Jin, South Korean singer, songwriter and actor
- 1992 – Joe Musgrove, American baseball player
- 1992 – Blake Snell, American baseball player
- 1994 – Gabriel Lundberg, Danish basketball player
- 1996 – Diogo Jota, Portuguese footballer (died 2025)
- 1996 – Sebastián Vegas, Chilean footballer
- 1999 – Kim Do-yeon, South Korean singer and actress
- 1999 – Kang Mi-na, South Korean actress and singer
- 2002 – María Dueñas, Spanish violinist and composer
- 2003 – Jackson Holliday, American baseball player
- 2003 – Kim Do-ah, South Korean singer and actress

== Deaths ==
=== Pre-1600 ===
- 749 – John of Damascus, Syrian priest and saint (born 676)
- 771 – Carloman I, Frankish king (born 751)
- 870 – Suairlech ind Eidnén mac Ciaráin, Irish bishop
- 1075 – Anno II, German archbishop and saint (born 1010)
- 1131 – Omar Khayyám, Persian poet, astronomer, mathematician, and philosopher (born 1048)
- 1214 – William the Lion, Scottish king (born 1143)
- 1260 – Aymer de Valence, Bishop of Winchester (born 1222)
- 1270 – Theobald II of Navarre (born 1238)
- 1334 – Pope John XXII (born 1249)
- 1340 – Henry Burghersh, English bishop and politician, Lord Chancellor of England (born 1292)
- 1341 – Janisław, Archbishop of Gniezno
- 1408 – Valentina Visconti, wife of Louis of Valois, Duke of Orléans
- 1456 – Charles I, Duke of Bourbon (born 1401)
- 1459 – Adolphus VIII, Count of Holstein (born 1401)
- 1576 – Georg Joachim Rheticus, Austrian-Slovak mathematician and cartographer (born 1514)
- 1585 – John Willock, Scottish minister and reformer (born 1515)

=== 1601–1900 ===
- 1603 – Maerten de Vos, Flemish painter and draughtsman (born 1532)
- 1609 – Alexander Hume, Scottish poet (born 1560)
- 1637 – Nicholas Ferrar, English trader (born 1592)
- 1642 – Cardinal Richelieu, French cardinal and politician, Chief Minister to the French Monarch (born 1585)
- 1649 – William Drummond of Hawthornden, Scottish poet (born 1585)
- 1679 – Thomas Hobbes, English philosopher and theorist (born 1588)
- 1680 – Thomas Bartholin, Danish physician, mathematician, and theologian (born 1616)
- 1696 – Empress Meishō of Japan (born 1624)
- 1728 – Richard Ferrier, English politician (born c. 1671)
- 1732 – John Gay, English poet and playwright (born 1685)
- 1798 – Luigi Galvani, Italian physician, physicist, and philosopher (born 1737)
- 1828 – Robert Jenkinson, 2nd Earl of Liverpool, English politician, Prime Minister of the United Kingdom (born 1770)
- 1839 – John Leamy, Irish–American merchant (born 1757)
- 1841 – David Daniel Davis, Welsh-English physician and academic (born 1777)
- 1845 – Gregor MacGregor, Scottish soldier and explorer (born 1786)
- 1850 – William Sturgeon, English physicist, invented the electric motor (born 1783)
- 1893 – John Tyndall, Irish-English physicist and chemist (born 1820)
- 1897 – Griffith Rhys Jones, Welsh conductor (born 1834)

=== 1901–present ===
- 1902 – Charles Dow, American journalist and publisher, co-founded the Dow Jones & Company (born 1851)
- 1926 – Ivana Kobilca, Slovenian painter (born 1861)
- 1932 – Edmund Wojtyła, Polish doctor (born 1906)
- 1933 – Stefan George, German-Swiss poet and translator (born 1868)
- 1935 – Johan Halvorsen, Norwegian violinist, composer, and conductor (born 1864)
- 1935 – Charles Richet, French physiologist and academic, Nobel Prize laureate (born 1850)
- 1938 – Borghild Holmsen, Norwegian pianist, composer and music critic (born 1865)
- 1938 – Tamanishiki San'emon, Japanese sumo wrestler, the 32nd Yokozuna (born 1903)
- 1942 – Juhan Kukk, Estonian politician, 3rd Head of State of Estonia (born 1885)
- 1942 – Fritz Löhner-Beda, Jewish Austrian librettist, lyricist and writer (born 1883)
- 1944 – Roger Bresnahan, American baseball player and manager (born 1879)
- 1945 – Thomas Hunt Morgan, American geneticist and biologist, Nobel Prize laureate (born 1866)
- 1945 – Richárd Weisz, Hungarian Olympic champion wrestler (born 1879)
- 1948 – Frank Benford, American physicist and engineer (born 1883)
- 1950 – Jesse L. Brown, 1st African-American Naval aviator (born 1926)
- 1954 – George Shepherd, 1st Baron Shepherd (born 1881)
- 1955 – József Galamb, Hungarian-American engineer (born 1881)
- 1963 – Constance Davey, Australian psychologist (born 1882)
- 1967 – Bert Lahr, American actor (born 1895)
- 1969 – Fred Hampton, American Black Panthers activist (born 1948)
- 1971 – Shunryū Suzuki, Japanese-American monk and educator, founded the San Francisco Zen Center (born 1904)
- 1975 – Hannah Arendt, German-American historian, theorist, and academic (born 1906)
- 1976 – Tommy Bolin, American guitarist and songwriter (born 1951)
- 1976 – Benjamin Britten, English pianist, composer, and conductor (born 1913)
- 1976 – W. F. McCoy, Irish soldier, lawyer, and politician (born 1886)
- 1980 – Francisco de Sá Carneiro, Portuguese lawyer and politician, 111th Prime Minister of Portugal (born 1934)
- 1980 – Stanisława Walasiewicz, Polish-American runner (born 1911)
- 1980 – Don Warrington, Canadian football player (born 1948)
- 1981 – Jeanne Block, American psychologist (born 1923)
- 1984 – Jack Mercer, American animator, screenwriter, voice actor, and singer (born 1910)
- 1987 – Arnold Lobel, American author and illustrator (born 1933)
- 1987 – Rouben Mamoulian, Armenian-American director and screenwriter (born 1897)
- 1988 – Osman Achmatowicz, Polish chemist and academic (born 1899)
- 1992 – Henry Clausen, American lawyer and author (born 1905)
- 1993 – Margaret Landon, American missionary and author (born 1903)
- 1993 – Frank Zappa, American singer-songwriter, guitarist, and producer (born 1940)
- 1999 – Rose Bird, American academic and judge, 25th Chief Justice of California (born 1936)
- 2000 – Henck Arron, Surinamese banker and politician, 1st Prime Minister of the Republic of Suriname (born 1936)
- 2003 – Iggy Katona, American race car driver (born 1916)
- 2004 – Elena Souliotis, Greek soprano and actress (born 1943)
- 2005 – Errol Brathwaite, New Zealand soldier and author (born 1924)
- 2005 – Gregg Hoffman, American film producer (born 1963)
- 2006 – K. Ganeshalingam, Sri Lankan accountant and politician, Mayor of Colombo (born 1938)
- 2006 – Ross A. McGinnis, American soldier, Medal of Honor recipient (born 1987)
- 2007 – Pimp C, American rapper (born 1973)
- 2009 – Liam Clancy, Irish singer, actor, and guitarist (born 1935)
- 2010 – King Curtis Iaukea, American wrestler (born 1937)
- 2011 – Sonia Pierre, Haitian-Dominican activist (born 1965)
- 2011 – Sócrates, Brazilian footballer and manager (born 1954)
- 2011 – Hubert Sumlin, American singer and guitarist (born 1931)
- 2012 – Vasily Belov, Russian author, poet, and playwright (born 1932)
- 2012 – Jack Brooks, American colonel, lawyer, and politician (born 1922)
- 2012 – Miguel Calero, Colombian footballer and manager (born 1971)
- 2012 – Anthony Deane-Drummond, English general (born 1917)
- 2013 – Joana Raspall i Juanola, Spanish author and poet (born 1913)
- 2014 – Claudia Emerson, American poet and academic (born 1957)
- 2014 – V. R. Krishna Iyer, Indian lawyer and judge (born 1914)
- 2014 – Vincent L. McKusick, American lawyer and judge (born 1921)
- 2014 – Jeremy Thorpe, English lawyer and politician (born 1929)
- 2015 – Bill Bennett, Canadian lawyer and politician, 27th Premier of British Columbia (born 1932)
- 2015 – Robert Loggia, American actor and director (born 1930)
- 2015 – Yossi Sarid, Israeli journalist and politician, 15th Israeli Minister of Education (born 1940)
- 2016 – Patricia Robins, British writer and WAAF officer (born 1921)
- 2017 – Shashi Kapoor, Indian actor (born 1938)
- 2022 – Bob McGrath, American singer and actor (born 1932)
- 2022 – Patrick Tambay, French race car driver (born 1949)
- 2024 – Princess Birgitta of Sweden, Swedish royal (born 1937)
- 2024 - Brian Thompson, businessman (born 1974)

== Holidays and observances ==
- Christian feast day:
  - Ada
  - Anno II
  - Barbara, and its related observances:
    - Barbórka, Miners' Day in Poland
    - Eid il-Burbara, a holiday similar to Halloween in honor of Saint Barbara. (Russia, Israel, Jordan, Lebanon, Palestine, Syria, Turkey)
  - Bernardo degli Uberti
  - Clement of Alexandria (Anglicanism, Eastern Catholicism)
  - Giovanni Calabria
  - John of Damascus
  - Maruthas
  - Nicholas Ferrar (Anglicanism)
  - Osmund
  - Sigiramnus
  - December 4 (Eastern Orthodox liturgics)
- Navy Day (India)
- Thai Environment Day (Thailand)
- Tupou I Day (Tonga)
