= Taedong Bridge =

Bridge in Pyongyang, North Korea

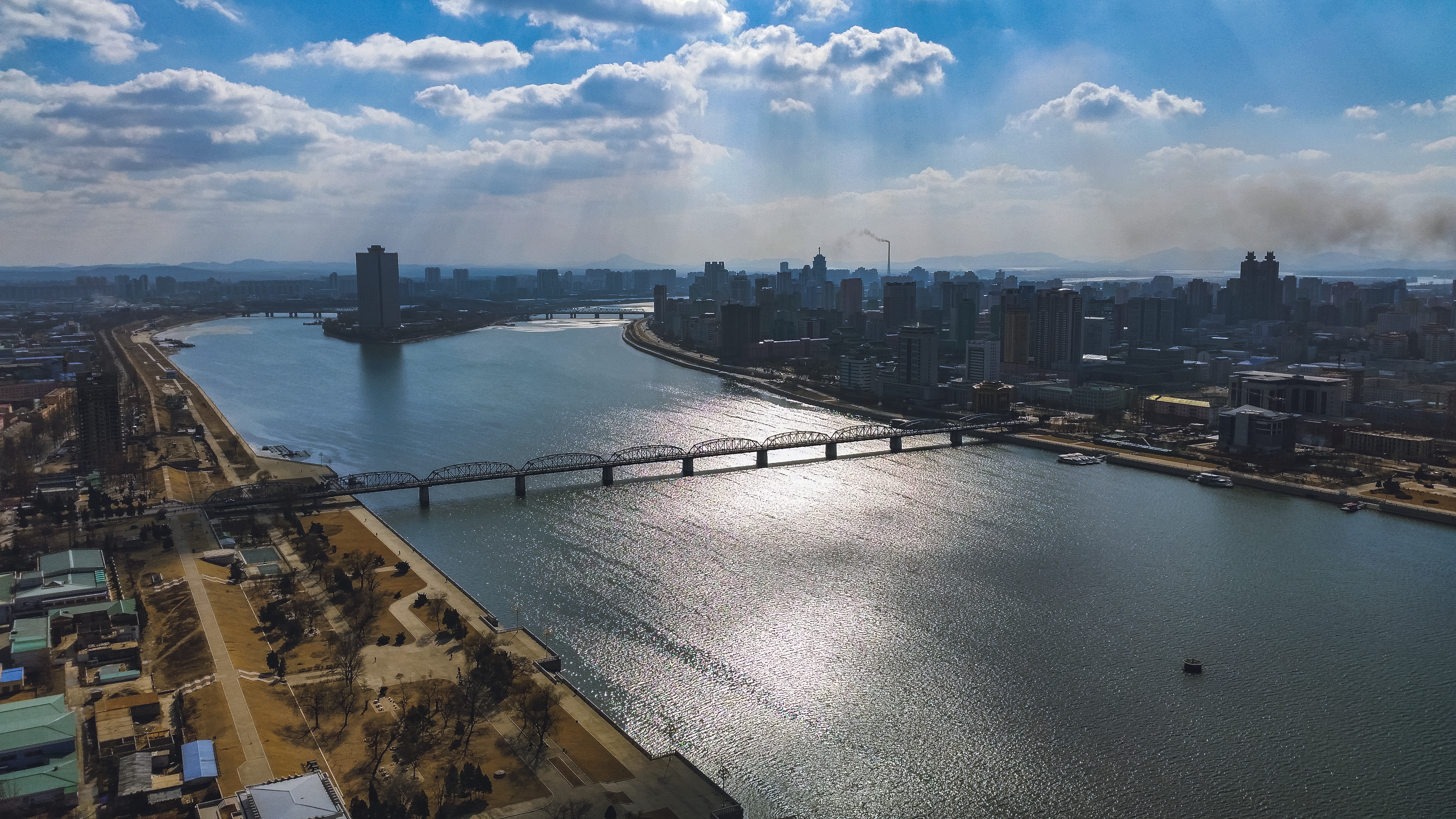
- Aerial view of the bridge (2018)
- Coordinates: 39°00′44″N 125°45′25″E
- Crosses: Taedong River
- Locale: Pyongyang, North Korea

History
- Built: 1905

Location
- Interactive map of Taedong Bridge

- Taedong Bridge
- Hangul: 대동교
- Hanja: 大同橋
- RR: Daedonggyo
- MR: Taedonggyo

The Taedong Bridge (Korean: 대동교) is a bridge over the Taedong River in Pyongyang, North Korea.

The bridge was built by the Japanese and completed in 1905. It is one of Pyongyang's two oldest east–west connections via the Taedong Gang, along with the Yanggak Bridge, built in the same year.

It was largely destroyed in the Korean War. When Chinese troops advanced near Pyongyang in the winter of 1950, thousands of civilians fled to the rubble of the bridge to cross the river in which several people were killed. The crossing of the ruined Taedong Bridge was part of the larger evacuation of Pyongyang during the Korean War. The event was taken on December 5, 1950, by Associated Press photographer Max Desfor titled Flight of Refugees Across Wrecked Bridge in Korea, for which he won the Pulitzer Prize for Photography in 1951.

== Gallery ==
feygeyfeeheyjeteuu
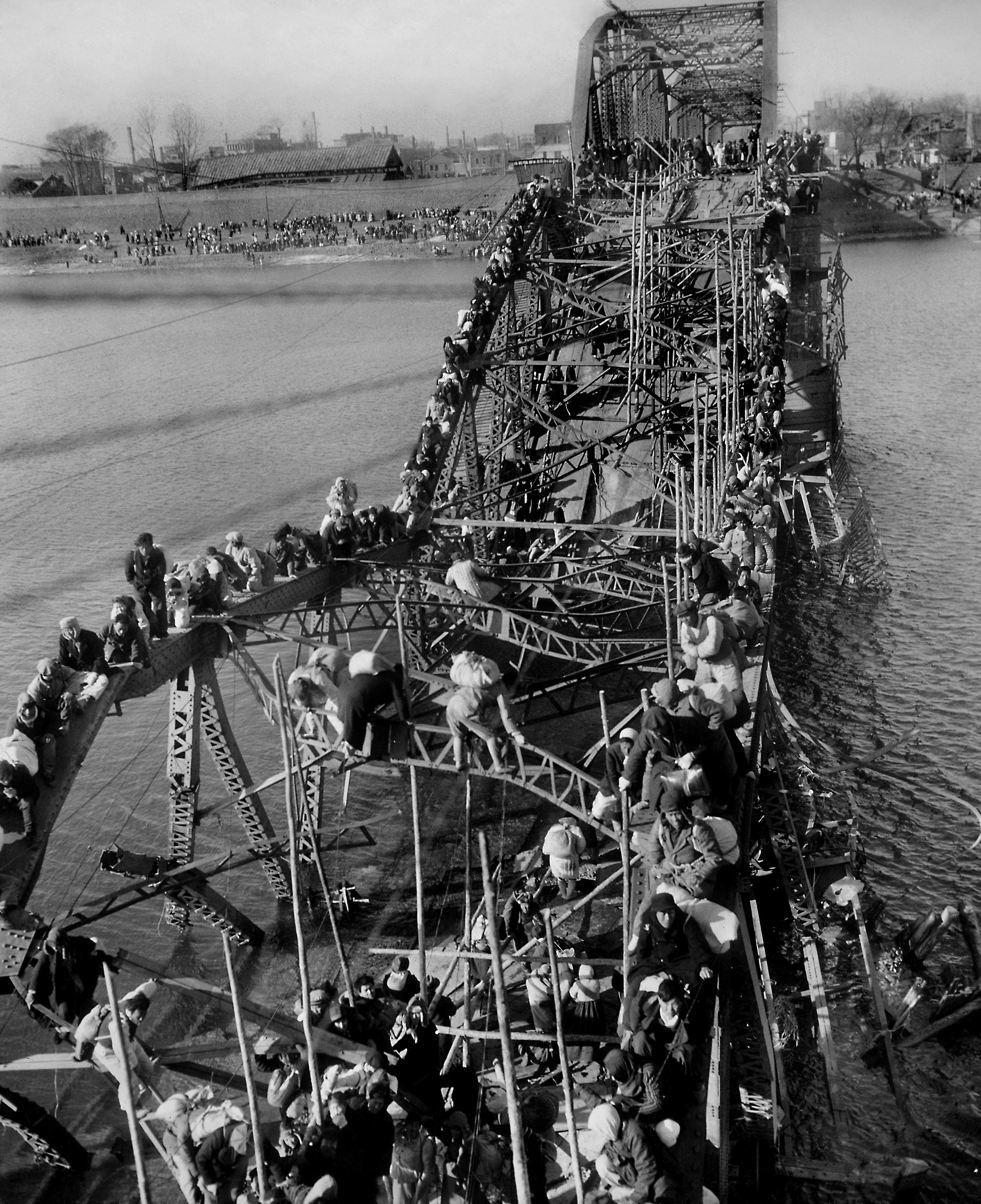
The Pulitzer Prize–winning photo Flight of Refugees Across Wrecked Bridge in Korea (1950)

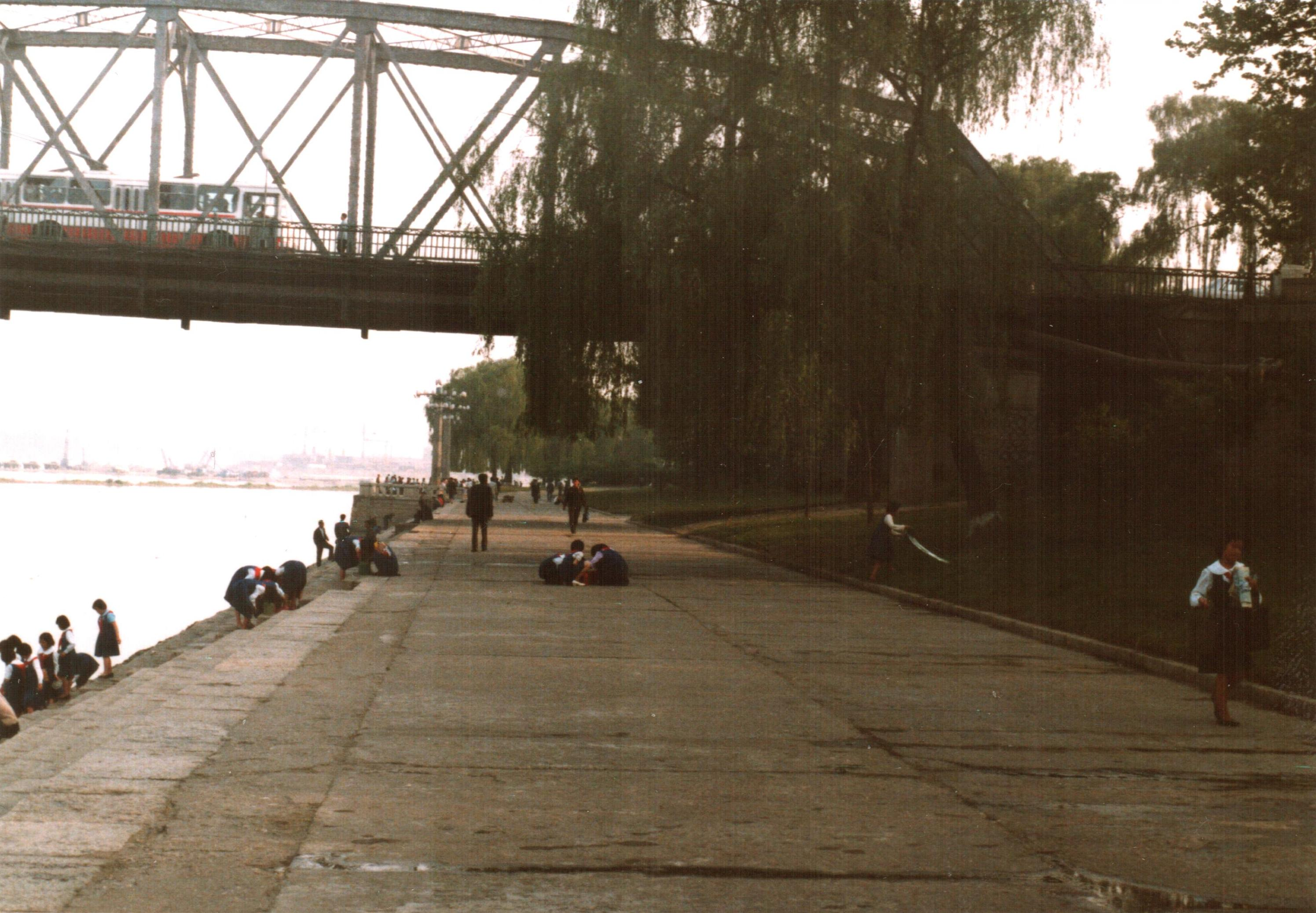
Under the bridge (1988)

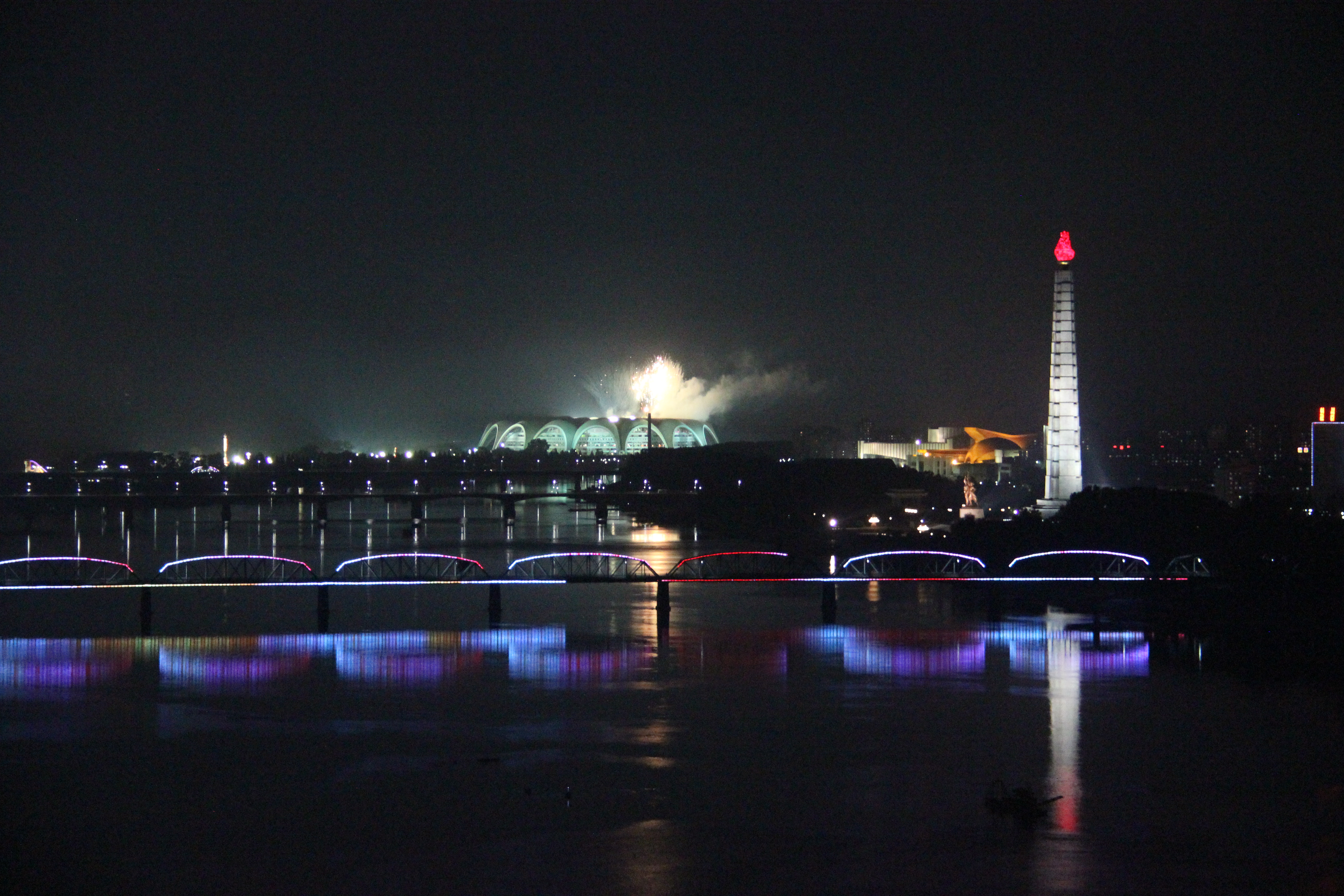
The bridge at night, along with Juche Tower to the right and fireworks for the Arirang Mass Games in background (2012)
