= Taedong River estuary Important Bird Area =

Conservation area in North Korea

Coordinates: 38°43′00″N 125°15′00″E

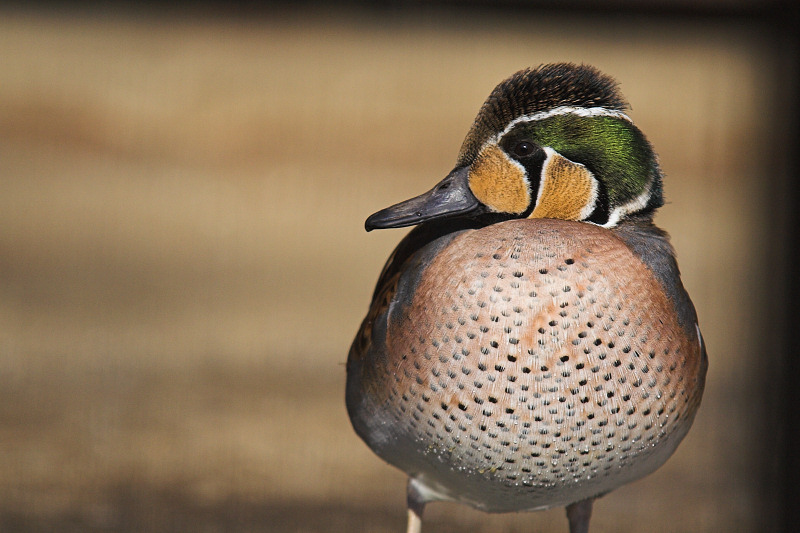
The site is important for wintering Baikal teals

The Taedong River estuary Important Bird Area is an 11,500 ha site in southern South Pyongan Province of North Korea, where the Taedong River meets the Yellow Sea. It has been identified by BirdLife International as an Important Bird Area (IBA) because it supports populations of various water birds. These include swan geese, mute swans, whooper swans, Baikal teals, Steller's sea eagles, red-crowned cranes and Saunders's gulls. The site comprises a range of wetlands including freshwater lakes, salt evaporation ponds and rice paddies. Threats to the IBA include agricultural intensification and aquacultural development.
