= Taedong River =

River in North Korea

Coordinates: 38°51′54″N 125°31′32″E

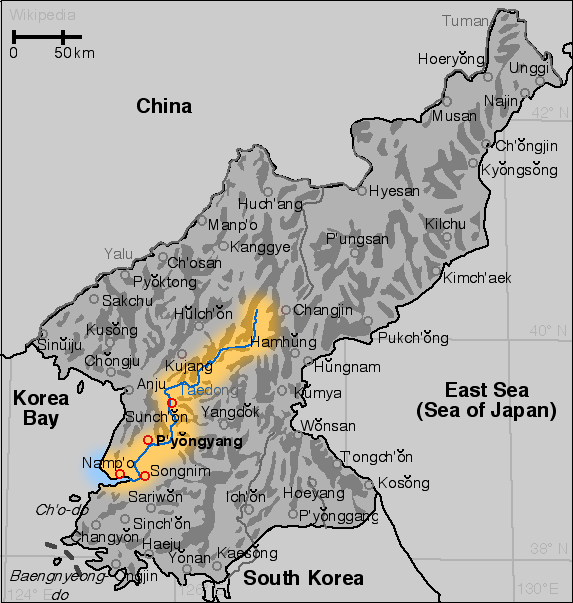
- Map of the Taedong River

Location
- Country: North Korea

Physical characteristics
- Source
  - location: Rangrim Mountains, South Hamgyong
- Mouth
  - location: West Korea Bay
- Length: 439 km (273 mi)
- Basin size: 20,344 km^{2} (7,855 sq mi)

- Taedong River
- Hangul: 대동강
- Hanja: 大同江
- RR: Daedonggang
- MR: Taedonggang

The Taedong River (Korean: 대동강) (Note: In the 19th century, the Taedong was spelled Tai-tang in Western texts (the "Tai-tang River" or "Tai-tang Kang").) is a large river in North Korea. The river rises in the Rangrim Mountains of the country's north where it then flows southwest into Korea Bay at Nampo. In between, it runs through the country's capital, Pyongyang. Along the river are landmarks such as the Juche Tower and Kim Il Sung Square.

The river is 439 kilometres (273 miles) in length, and is generally deep. It is the fifth-longest river on the Korean peninsula and the second-longest in North Korea. Pyongyang is approximately 110 km upstream from the mouth, Sunchon 192 km upstream, and Taehŭng 414 km upstream. Because of its depth, it is widely used for river transport; it is navigable by large ships up to 65 km inland, although most commercial traffic stops at Songrim.

== History ==
The kingdom of Koguryŏ was founded on its banks. Many archeological sites dating to the Neolithic and Bronze Age, as well as relics and ruins from Koguryŏ have been found along the river. It was also once known as the Pae River (패수; 浿水; P’aesu).

== Dams and bridges ==
A bridge over the Taedong River was partially destroyed during the Korean War. Despite the damage to the bridge, several hundred Koreans used it to cross the Taedong and flee south. Max Desfor's photograph of the event, Flight of Refugees Across Wrecked Bridge in Korea, would win the 1951 Pulitzer Prize in Photography.

In 1986, the government completed the 8-km-long West Sea Barrage, with three locks and 36 sluices, at the mouth of the Taedong River near Namp'o. The dam acts to control floodwater and to irrigate lands newly reclaimed from the Korea Gulf. The dam prevents mixing of the outgoing river water with seawater, leading to an increase of contaminants concentration. Other dams, such as the Nyongwon Power Station, have been built to provide energy to the country.

In Pyongyang, there are six bridges on the Taedong, including the Ongryu Bridge, Rungra Bridge, and Taedong Bridge.

== Gallery ==
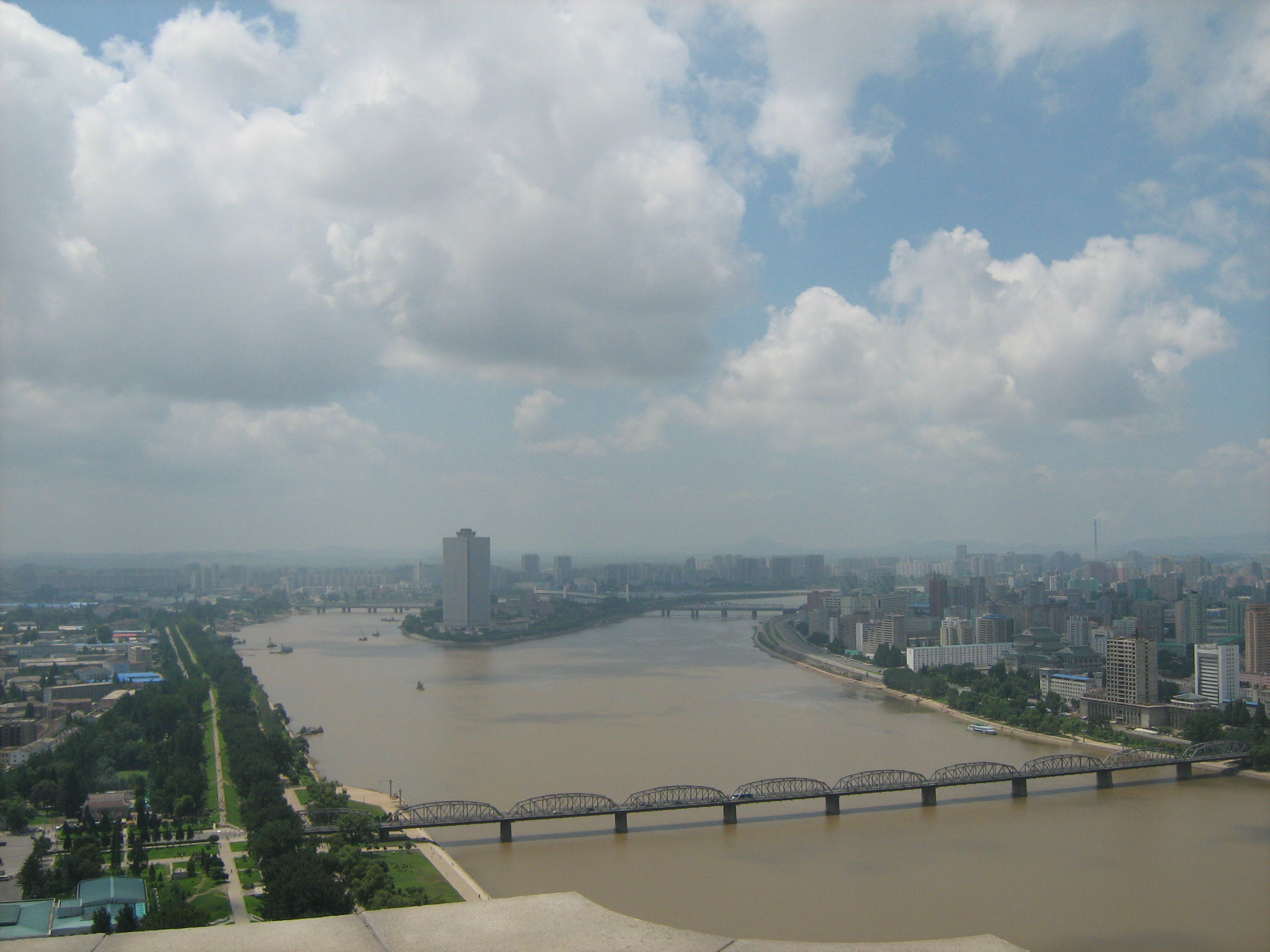
Yanggakdo Island in the middle of the river in Pyongyang

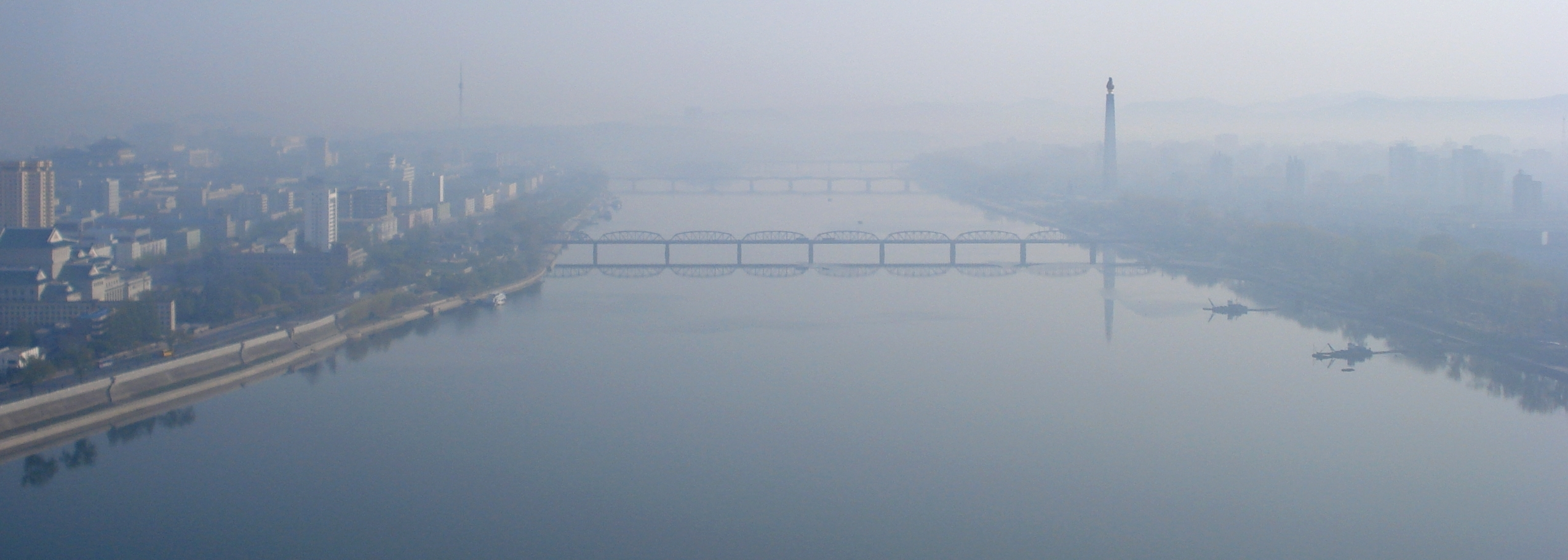
The Taedong River flowing through Pyongyang

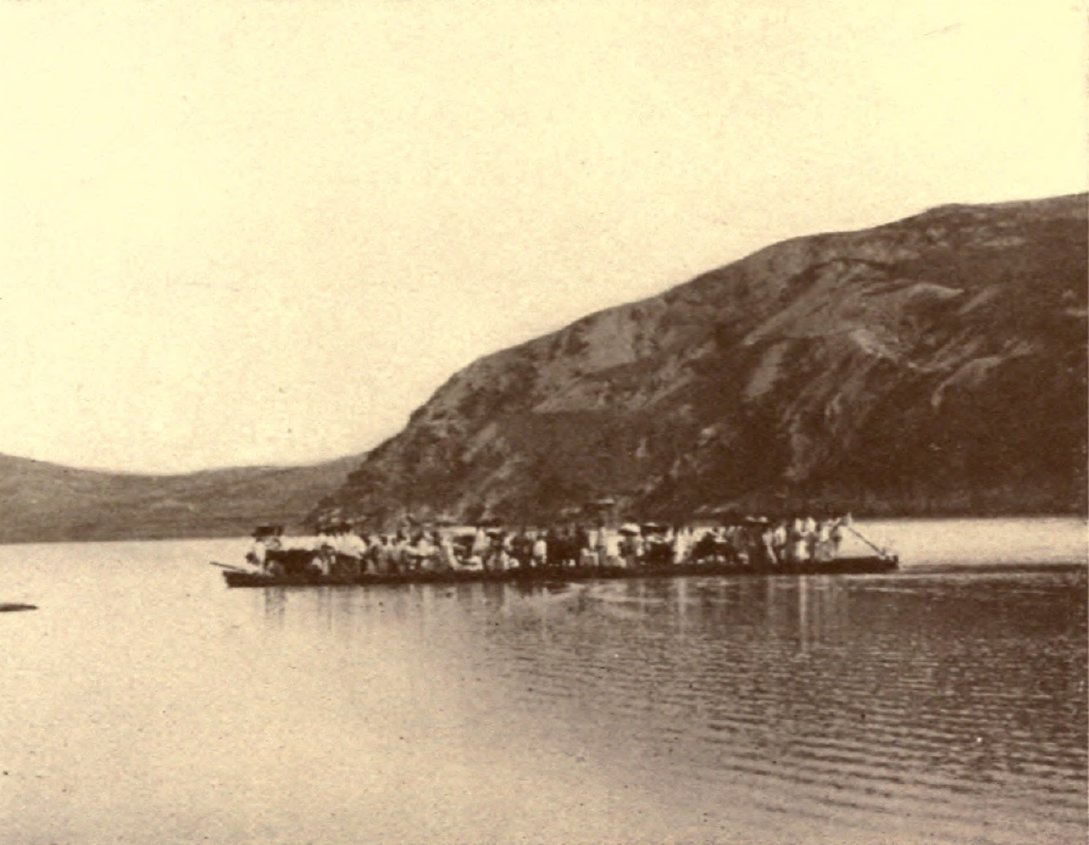
An image of the Taedong River from 1889

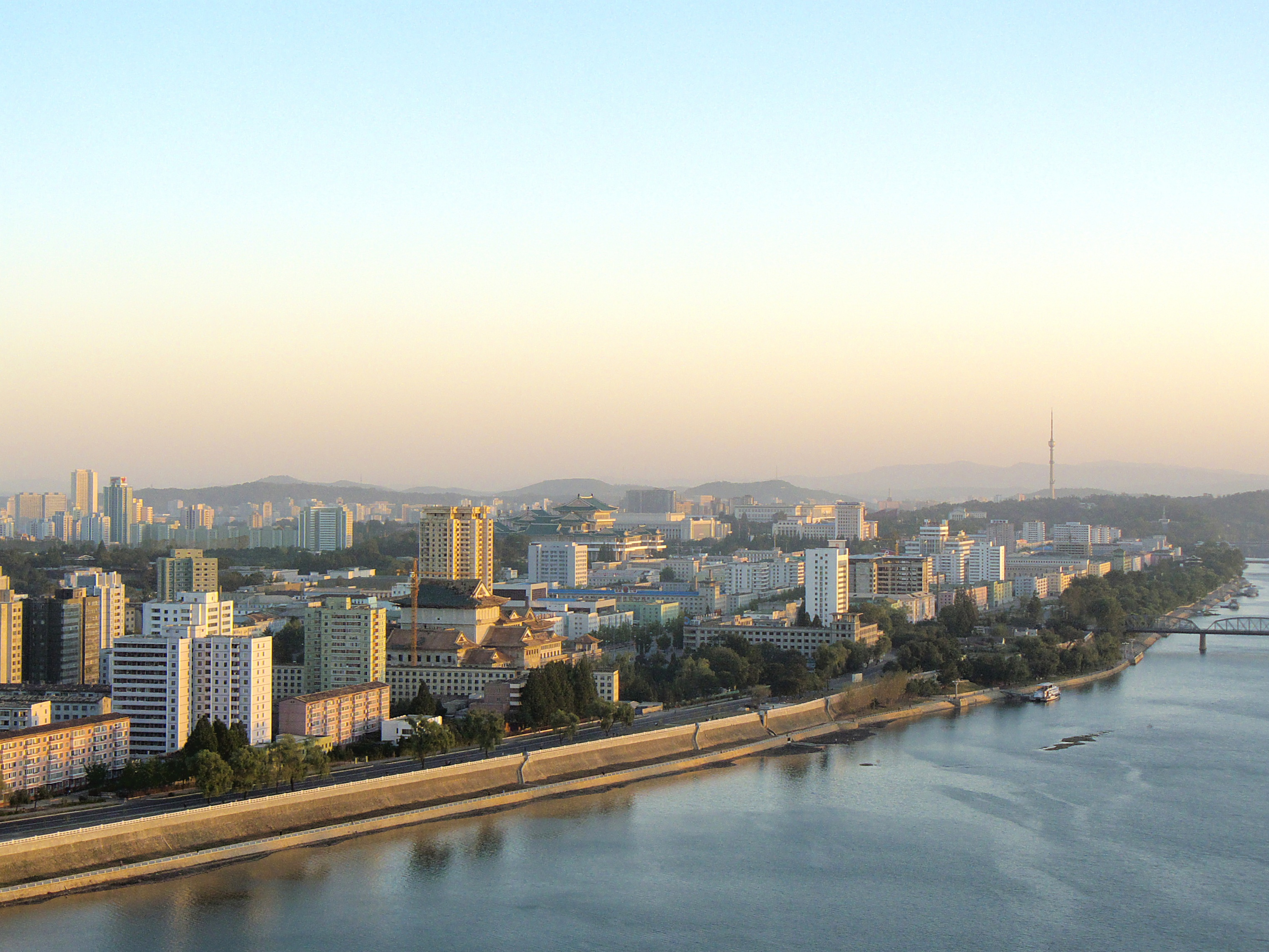
The Taedong in Pyongyang

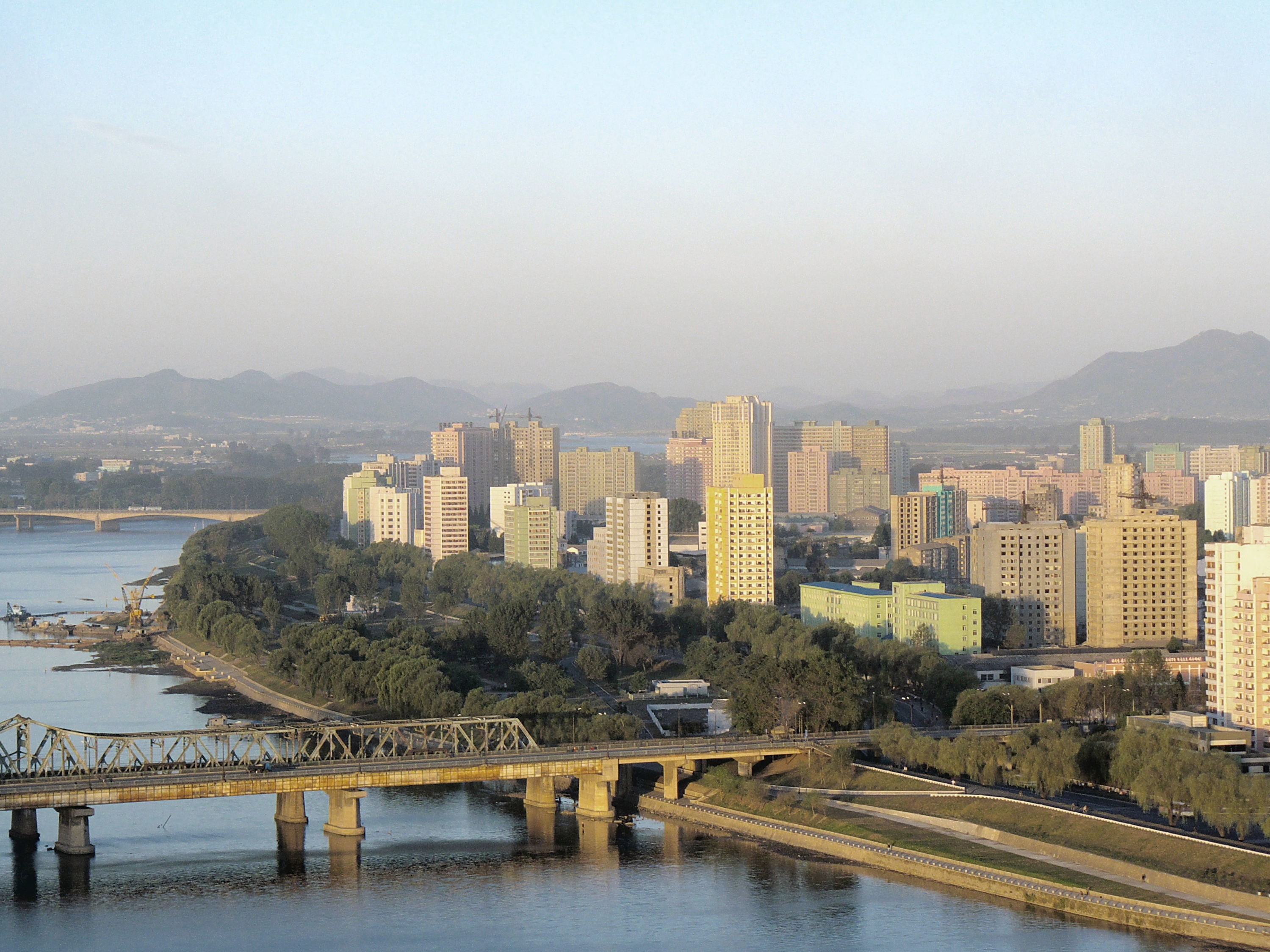
Another view of the river through Pyongyang

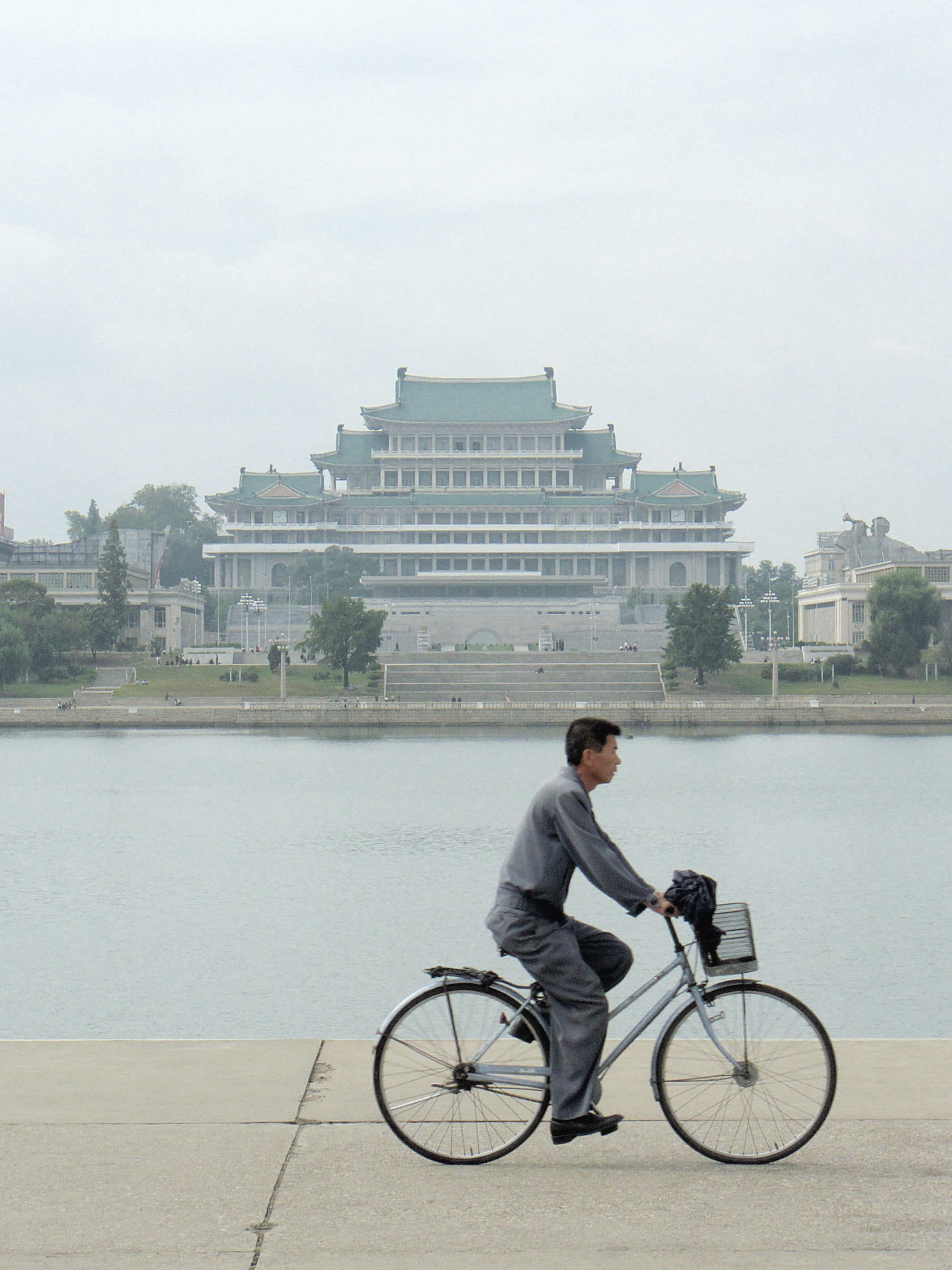
The Grand People's Study House on the bank of the river

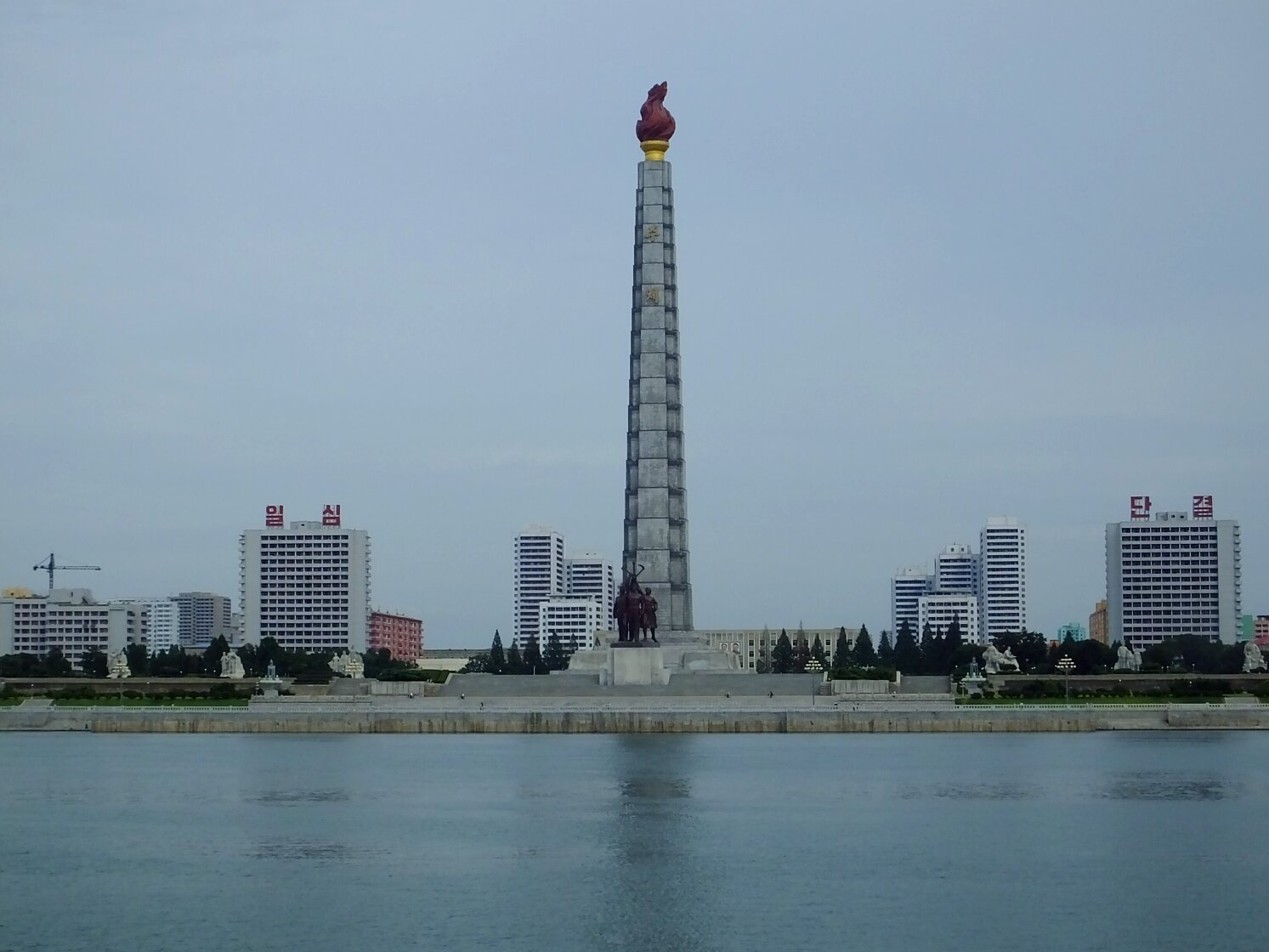
Juche Tower

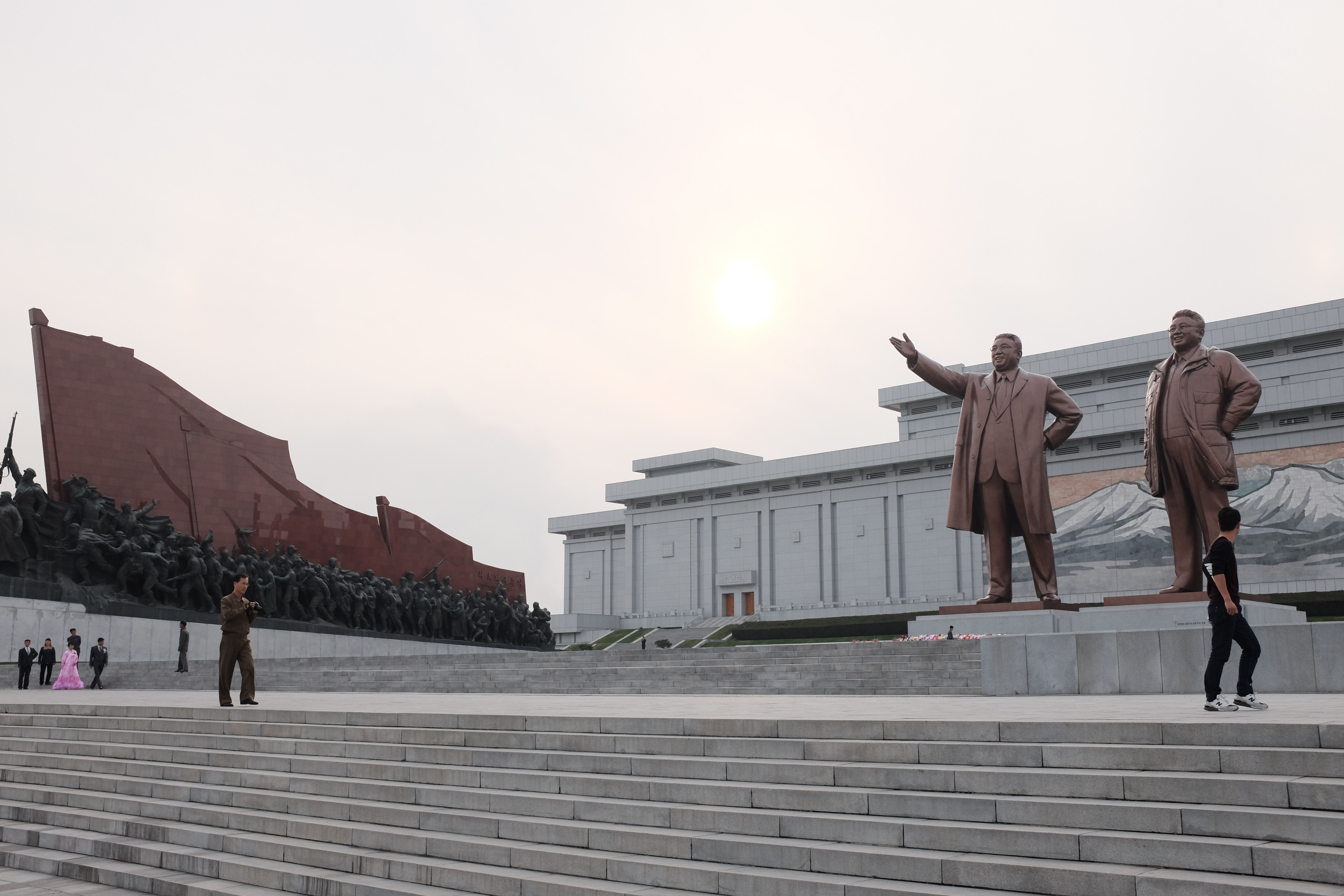
Mansudae Grand Monument

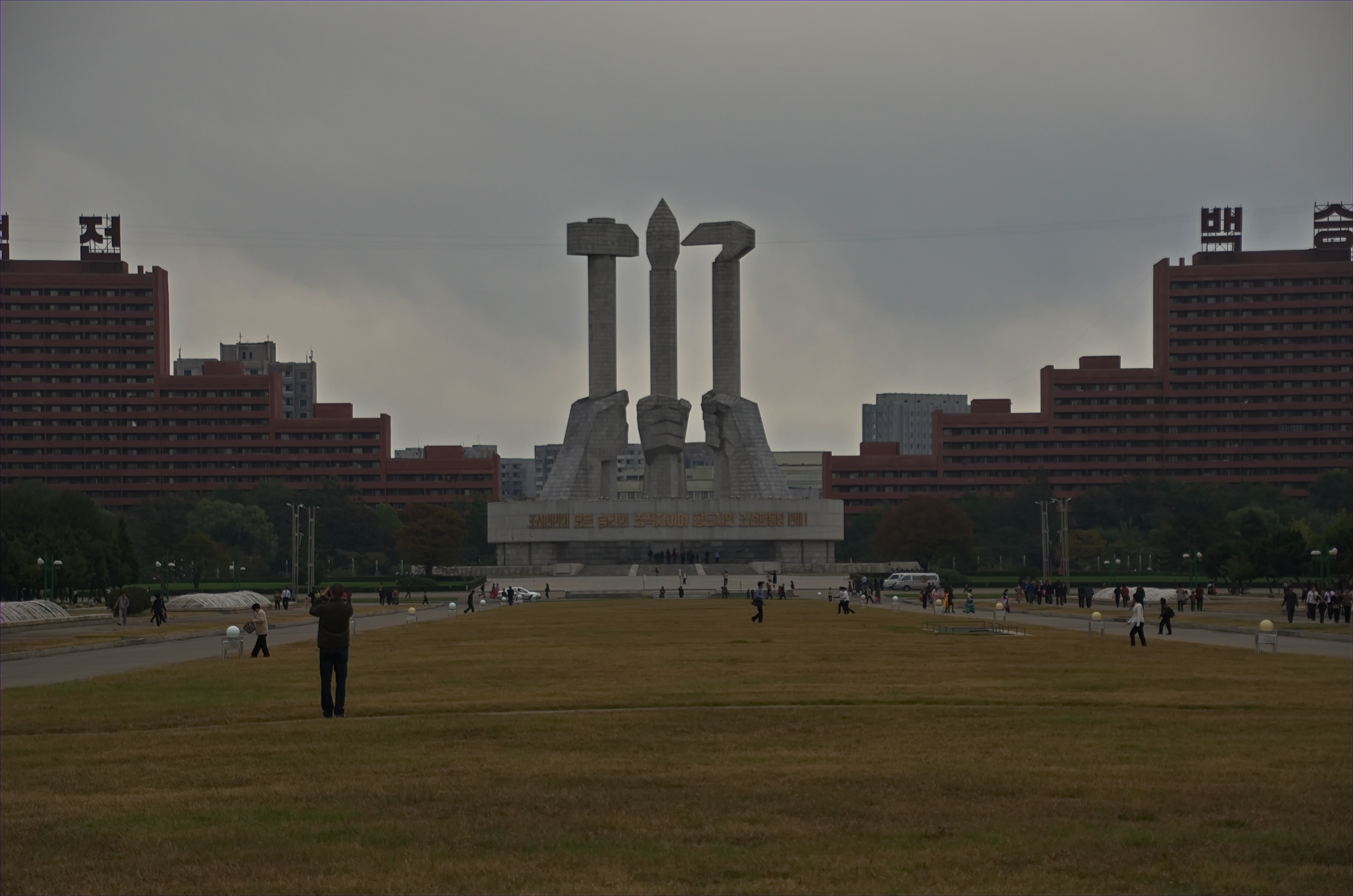
Monument to Party Founding

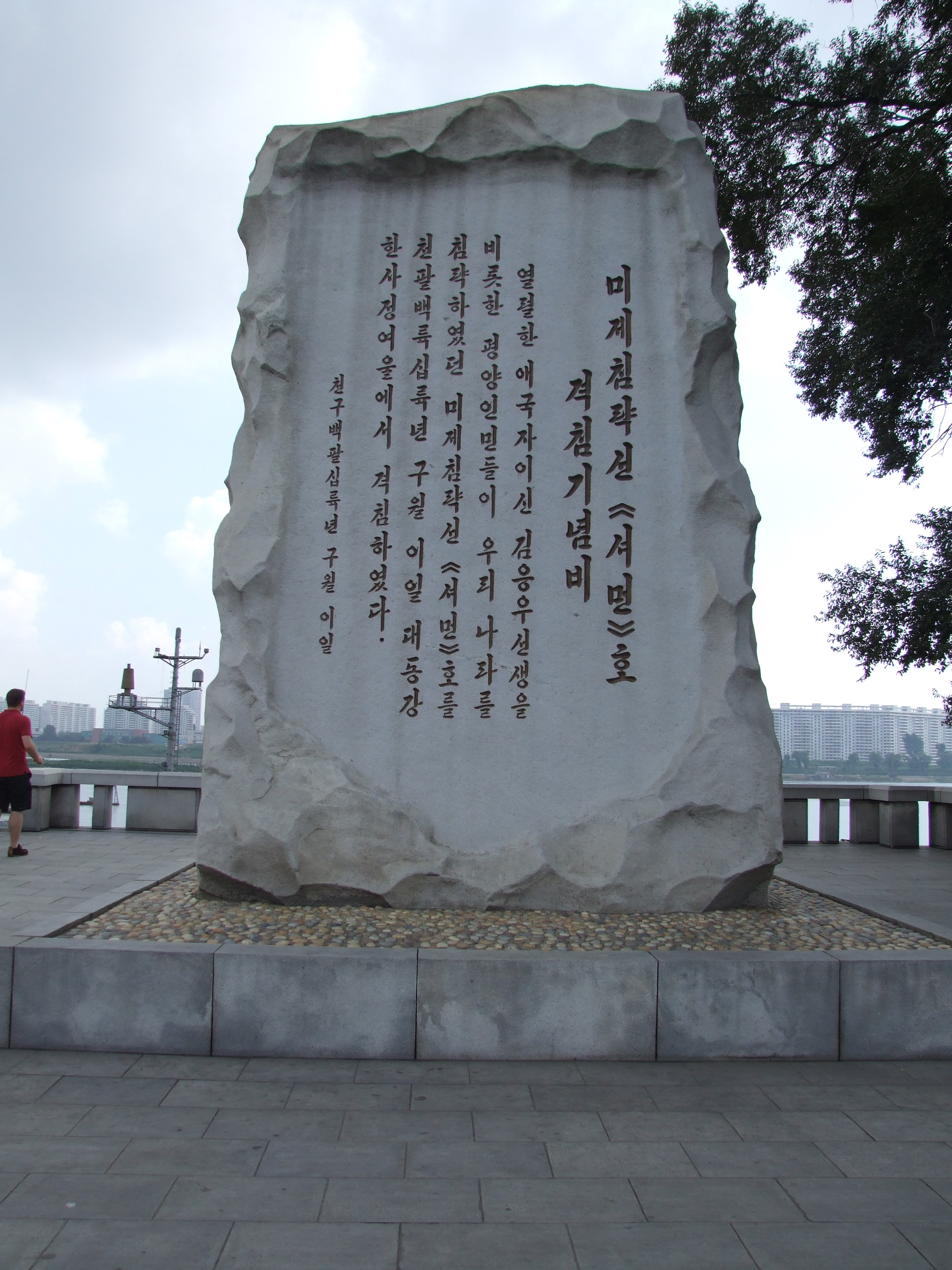
Monument to the USS Pueblo incident

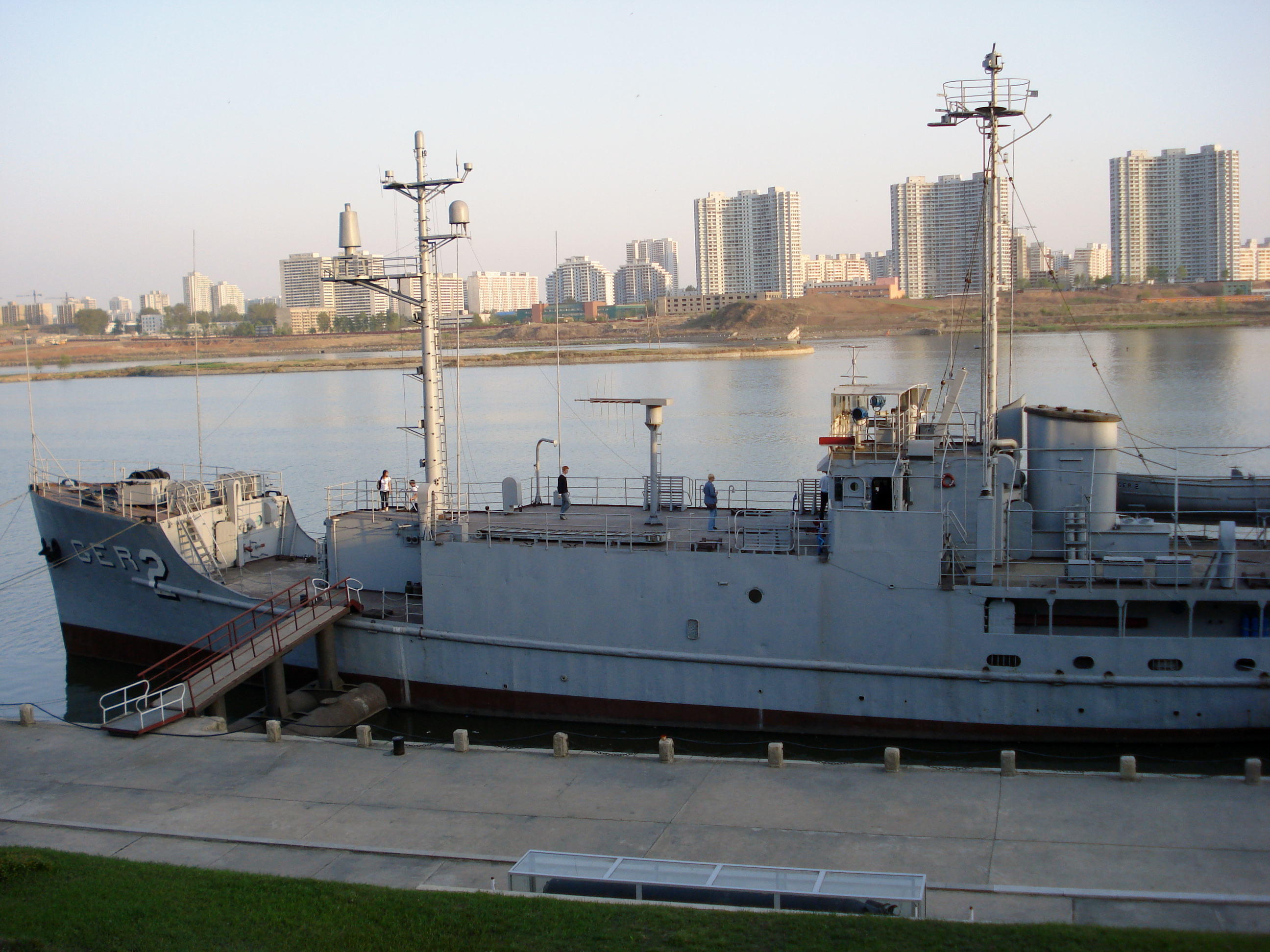
The captured USS Pueblo vessel moored on the Taedong (now tied up on the Botong River beside the Victorious Fatherland Liberation War Museum)

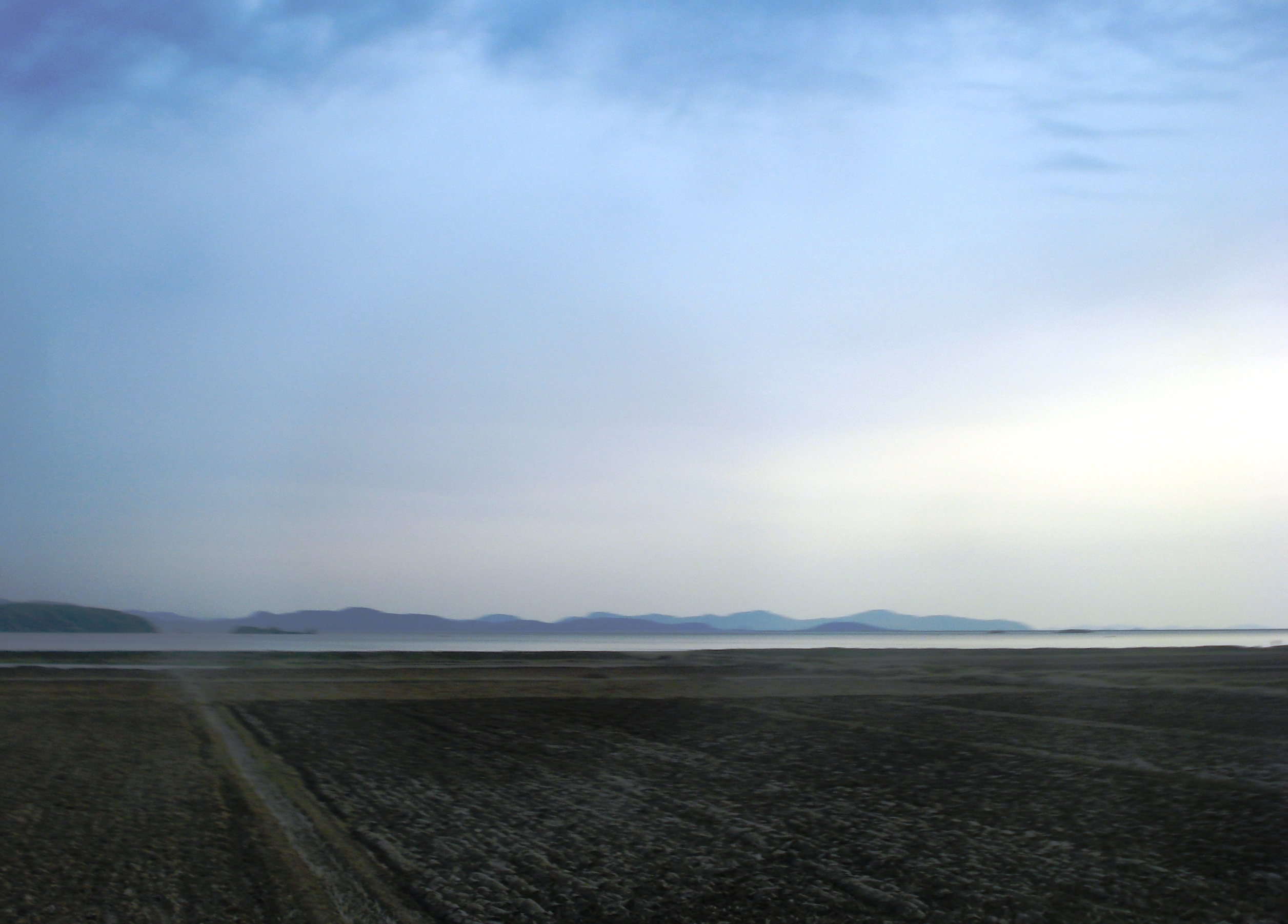
The Taedong River in Nampo

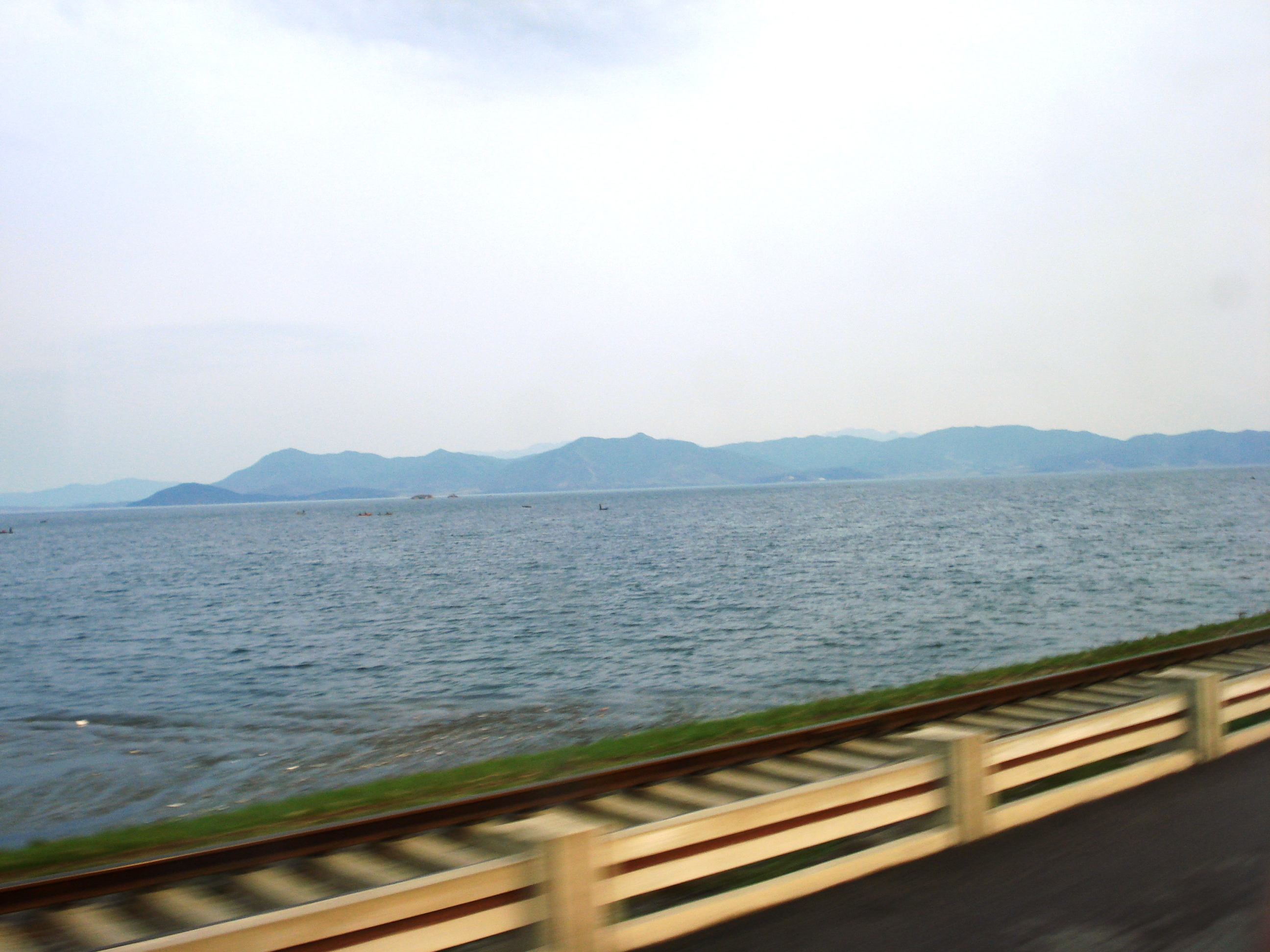
The river in Nampo

== See also ==
- Taedong River estuary Important Bird Area
- Taedonggang, a beer named after the river
- Rivers of Asia
- Rivers of Korea
- Geography of North Korea
