= Flight of Refugees Across Wrecked Bridge in Korea =

1950 Pulitzer Prize-winning photo

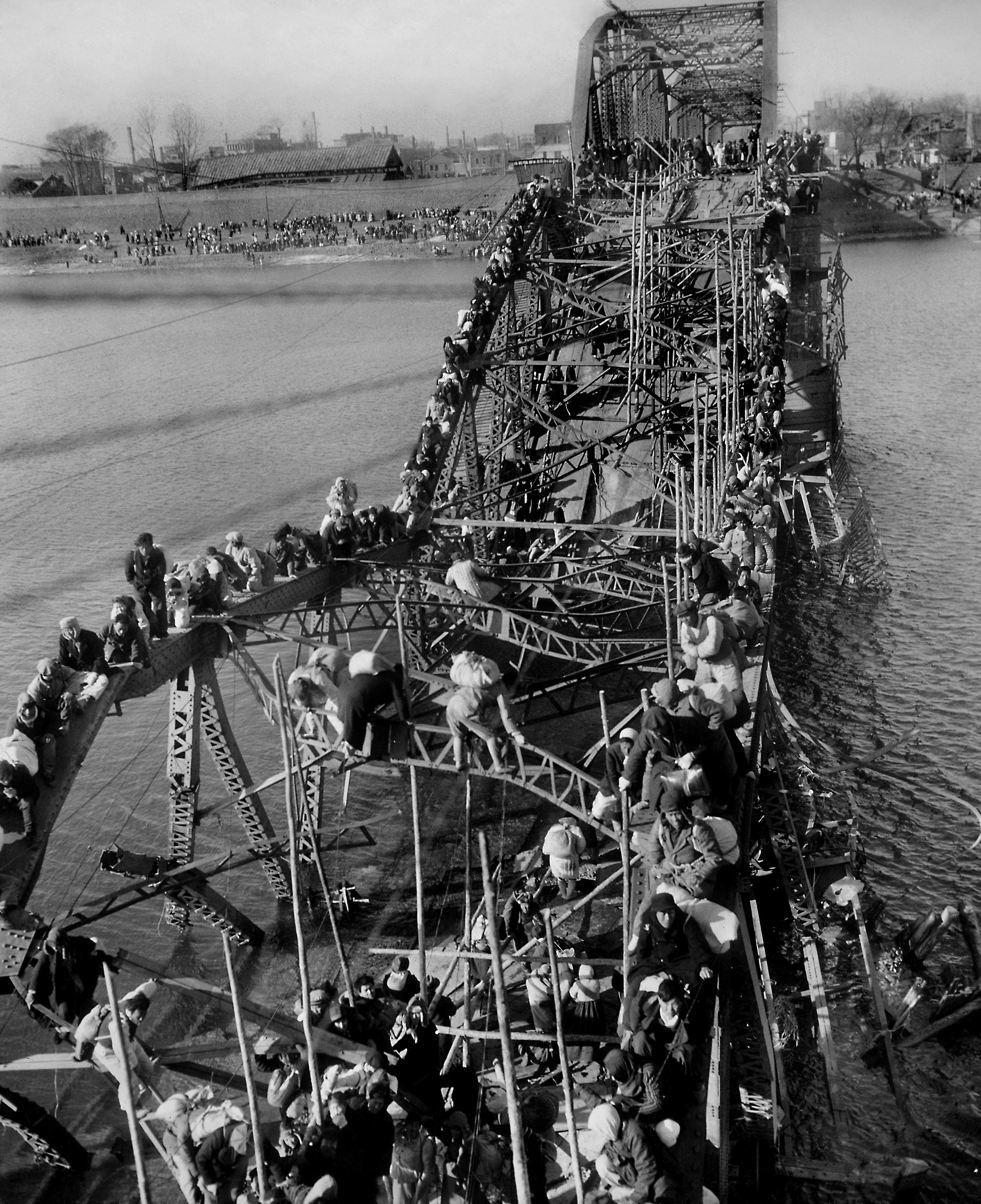
Flight of Refugees Across Wrecked Bridge in Korea, Pulitzer Prize-winning photo by Associated Press photographer Max Desfor

Flight of Refugees Across Wrecked Bridge in Korea is a Pulitzer Prize-winning photograph by Associated Press photographer Max Desfor, taken on December 4, 1950, at the destroyed Taedong Bridge over the Taedong River near Pyongyang, North Korea. Desfor was covering the Korean War at the time.

== Background ==
As U.S. and South Korean forces entered Pyongyang after the Battle of Inchon, KPA troops blew up the central span of the bridge in an attempt to halt their advance. United Nations forces continued to pursue the KPA but were in retreat after the Battle of the Ch'ongch'on River that marked China's entry into the war, and the Chinese and North Korean forces were by December poised to retake Pyongyang.

== Taking the photo ==
Desfor, a photographer for the Associated Press, traveled with front line troops, even taking part in a parachute jump with the 187th Infantry Regiment. After American troops started fleeing south, Desfor was able to commandeer a Jeep with two other reporters and an army signal corpsman headed south. They crossed the Taedong River at a United Nations pontoon bridge. While driving along the river's southern shore they observed Korean refugees crossing the river on foot where it was iced over, and using small boats where the river was open. Further down the southern shore they came across a destroyed bridge where they saw thousands of Koreans trying to cross the shattered girders of the bridge. It was December 4, 1950, at the beginning of winter, and Desfor had trouble working his camera because of the freezing temperatures.

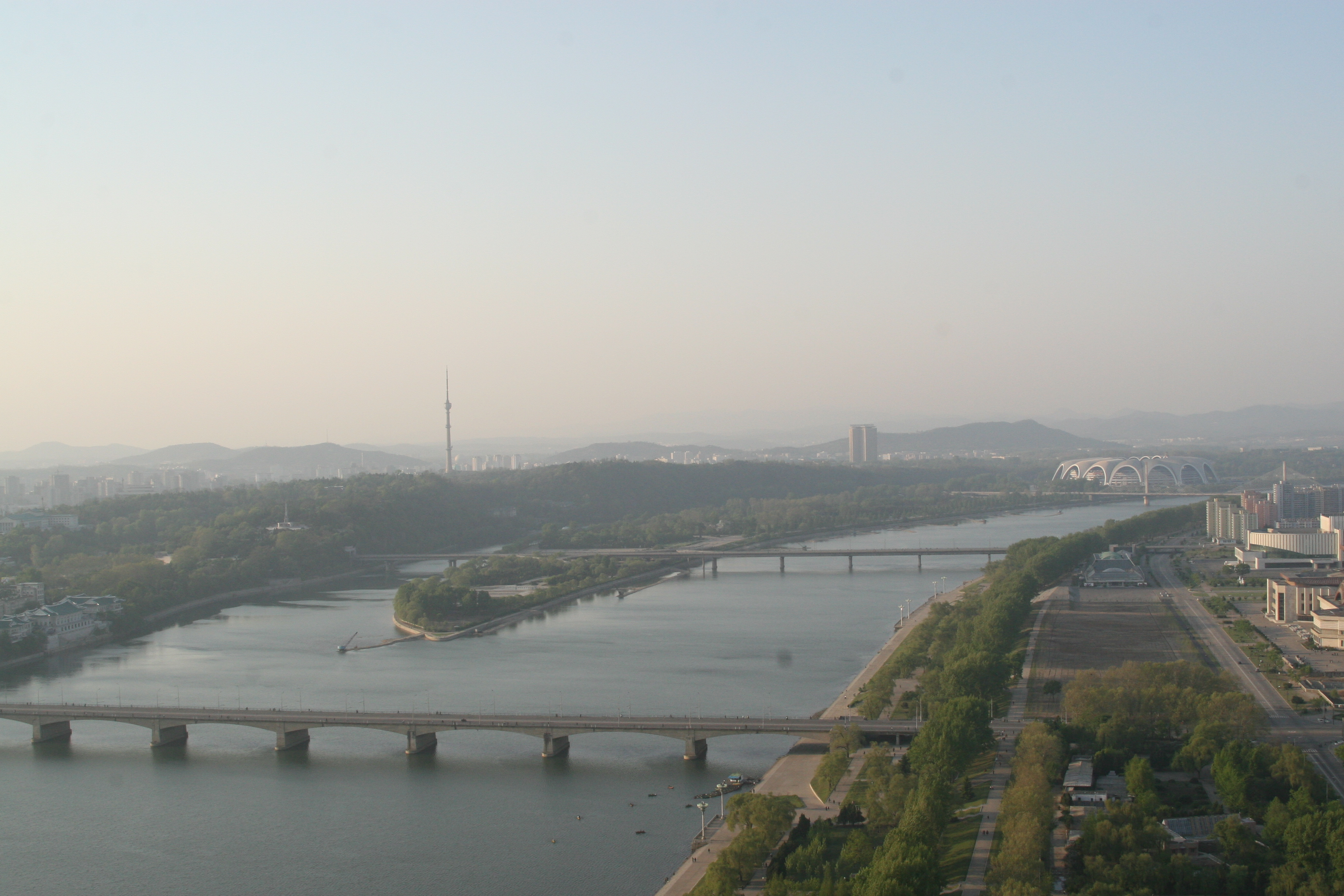
Taedong River as it passes through Pyongyang

== Desfor's 2010 visit to Korea ==
In June 2010, Desfor returned to Korea for the 60th anniversary of the war and he shared some of his thoughts. "I ask anyone who'll listen – why do they celebrate the start of the war? They celebrate the start, of course, because it's never ending – it's still going on." Desfor also talked about his time on the front line with the troops and, while proud of his Pulitzer Prize-winning photograph, believes that he took better photos during the war. Regarding the war itself he says, "The Korean War is labelled 'the Forgotten War', and the main reason is [American GIs] never got a parade when they got back, they never got relief, they never were cited for their effort for the work that was done. They were just completely forgotten."

== See also ==
- 1951 Pulitzer Prize
