= Murder of Fernando Balderas Sánchez and Yolanda Figueroa =

1996 murder of journalist couple in Mexico

Fernando Balderas Sánchez
- Born: ca. 1952; Mexico
- Died: 4 December 1996; Mexico City
- Cause of death: Beaten to death
- Occupation: Publisher
- Known for: Cuarto Poder (magazine)
- Spouse: Yolanda Figeroa
- Children: Three

Yolanda Figueroa Ojeda
- Born: 1953
- Died: 4 December 1996 (aged 42–43); Mexico City
- Cause of death: Beaten to death
- Occupation: Journalist
- Known for: El Capo del Golfo (Translated: The Capo of the Gulf)
- Spouse: Fernado Balderas Sánchez
- Children: Three

Murder of Fernando Balderas Sánchez and Yolanda Figueroa (4 December 1996) was an unusual group killing of two married journalists and their three children in Mexico City, Mexico that had the possibilities of being linked with drug cartels, corruption, criminal activities, or their work as journalists. The case was brought to a resolution within two weeks by the confession of one of the murderers, who was an employee, and his implication of two other coworkers. The two, a husband and wife, remain at large.

== Fernando Balderas Sánchez ==
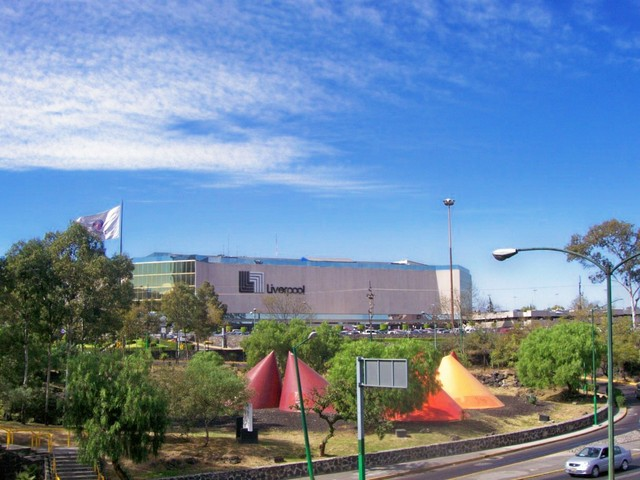
The Perisur Mall in the Jardines del Pedregal area of Mexico City.

Fernando Balderas Sánchez (1952 – 4 December 1996) was the publisher of Cuarto Poder (Translated: Fourth Estate), a crime magazine. For this publication, he could use his previous experience as a former Federal Judicial Police official. At the time of his murder, Balderas' reputation was called into question. Two reputable newspapers reported that sources told them Balderas was under investigation for taking money from drug cartels while he had worked in law enforcement, and he was accused of a sexual assault on his two maids but the warrant for his arrest was never served.

== Yolanda Figueroa ==
Yolanda Figueroa Ojeda (1953 – 4 December 1996) published in August 1996 her biographical account of narcotrafficker Juan García Ábrego and his Gulf Cartel, called El Capo del Golfo (Translated: The Capo of the Gulf). The crime boss was convicted in the United States in October 1996 and two months before the murder. She had dedicated her book to Ricardo Cordero Ontiveros, Mexico's attorney general, who was fired and confined days before the family was murdered.

Fernando Balderas and Yolanda Figueroa were the parents of a daughter, 18, and two sons, 14 and 8.

== Murders ==
Police checked out an abandoned red Mustang and that led them to its owner Fernando Balderas Sánchez and his home in the upscale Pedregal neighborhood of Mexico City. Suspicious, police broke into the house and discovered the family of five murdered and its driver left unconscious. Sánchez, Figueroa, a daughter, and two sons were murdered with an 18-inch chisel while asleep in their home. The 8-year-old boy was the only victim stabbed with a knife. The family driver, Alejandro Perez de la Rosa, around 27 years old, survived the attack but was left unconscious on the premises. The family's driver Perez confessed during the investigation that he and two other employed servants had murdered the journalists and their three kids. According to Perez, their motive was revenge against Balderas who he said held the family's two maids captive and sexually abused them. Perez was beaten by the other two for his share of the possessions.

Alejandro Perez de la Rosa, could have received a 50-year sentence but was handed down a 118-year prison sentence because of the brutality of the crime. His co-conspirators, the driver Martin Hernandez and the maid Josefina Hernandez, remain at large but Mexican police were looking for them in their home state of Veracruz.

== Context ==
Mentioned locations within Mexico relative to the capital Mexico City.

The different theories about how the family of the two married journalists were killed revealed the vulnerability of journalists in Mexico.

One theory involved the drug cartel retaliation for the book Yolanda Figueroa had just published about the capture of drug lord Juan García Ábrego. García was the head of the Gulf Cartel, which controlled the Tamaulipas and Nuevo León areas at the time he was caught 14 January 1996. He was convicted two months before the murder. The United States had first put out a warrant for his arrest in 1993 and he had been on the U.S. Federal Bureau of Investigation's FBI Ten Most Wanted Fugitives in 1995. Proponents of this theory believed Figueroa's book and dedication to the attorney general made her a target. The style of the murder, however, did not match previous drug-related executions, and skeptics said the murders high visibility carried risks of a backlash against the cartels.

Another theory was that Bandaras had been taking bribes or was associated with the drug cartels and on its payroll while serving in the Federal Judicial Police. Bandaras could have also been involved in a crime ring. After Perez confessed to the murder, police announced an investigation for extortion or theft into the six luxury cars owned by Bandaras.

== Reactions ==
The International Press Institute said the murder of Figueroa's family was the most violent in 1996. Homero Aridjis, a writer and environmental activist who would be elected to head PEN International in 1997, said, "There has been nothing like this before. This is creating an atmosphere of narco-terrorism like Colombia. People are living in terror. They don't want to write, they don't want to talk about drug trafficking." Rick Rockwell, a professor of journalism at Northwestern University, wrote, "Although it is far too early in the investigation to know who is behind this multiple murder or whether corrupt government officials might have ties to it, it is clear there's a battle against honest journalism going on south of the border--and the journalists are losing." Eduardo Valle, a source for Figueroa's book, said, "You die if you write about this stuff. If you get to the bottom of this drug trafficking, they will kill you."

== Books ==
- Yolanda Figueroa, El Capo del Golfo : vida y captura de Juan García Abrego, México, D.F. : Grijalbo, 1996. ISBN 9700506665

== See also ==
- Mexican drug war
- List of journalists killed in Mexico
