= 1951 Pulitzer Prize =

Awards for journalism and related fields

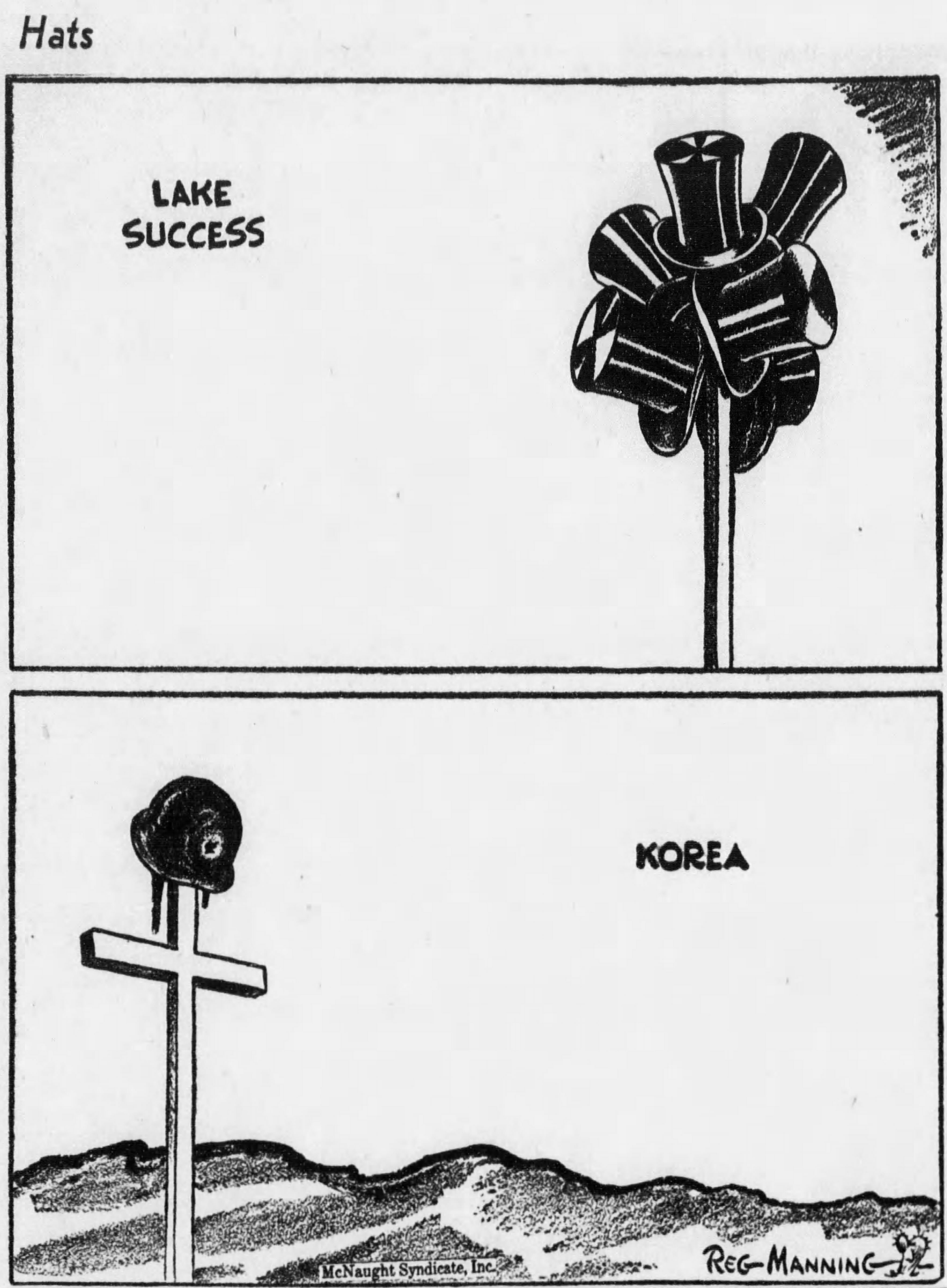
"Hats", the prize-winning editorial cartoon

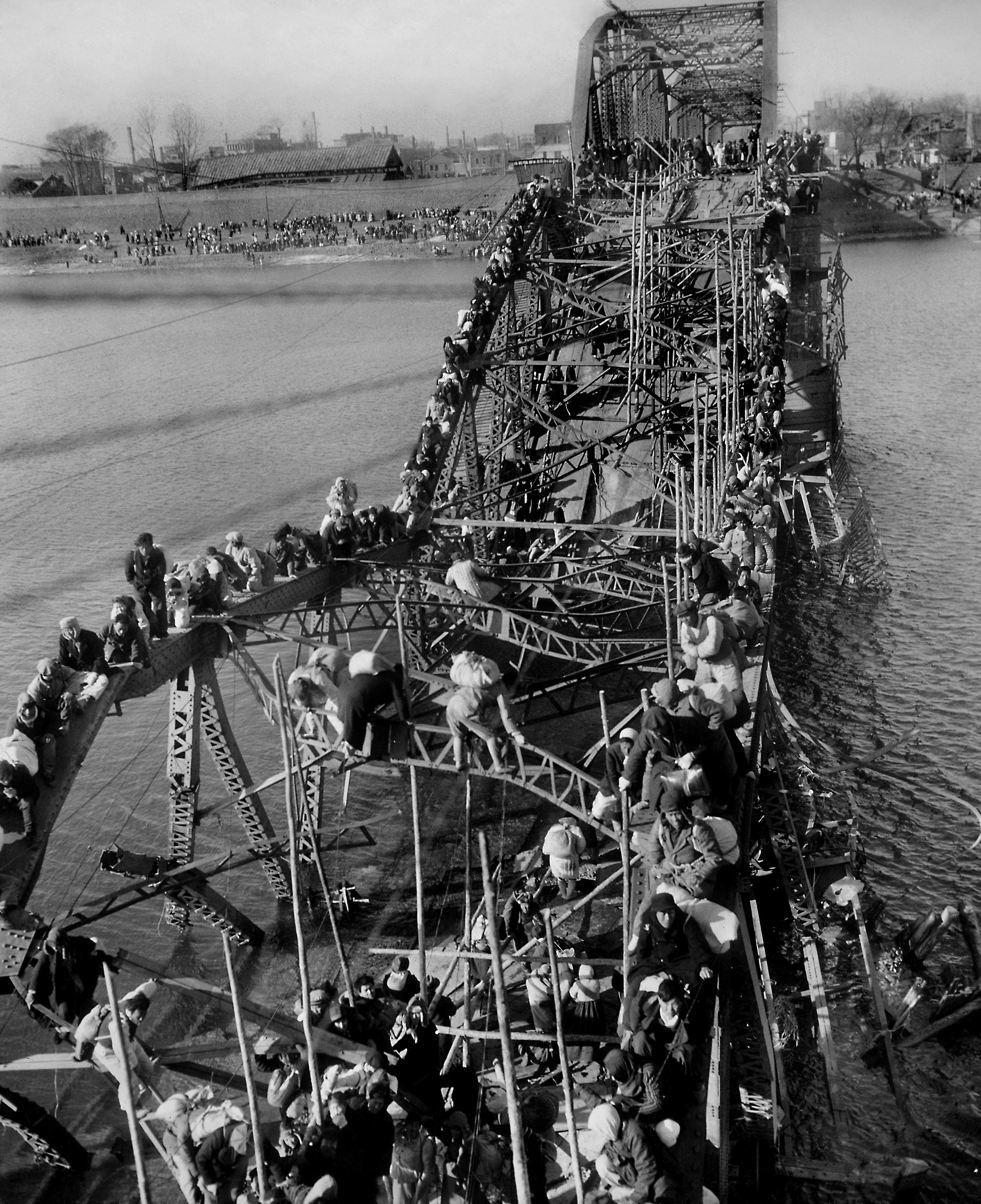
"Flight of Refugees Across Wrecked Bridge in Korea", cited as an exemplary work by the prize-winning photographer, Max Desfor

The following are the Pulitzer Prizes for 1951.

== Journalism awards ==
- Public Service:
  - The Miami Herald and the Brooklyn Eagle, for their reporting on organized crime during the year.
- Local Reporting:
  - Edward S. Montgomery of the San Francisco Examiner, for his series of articles on tax frauds which culminated in an exposé within the Bureau of Internal Revenue.
- National Reporting:
  - No award given.
- International Reporting:
  - Keyes Beech (Chicago Daily News); Homer Bigart (New York Herald Tribune); Marguerite Higgins (New York Herald Tribune); Relman Morin (AP); Fred Sparks (Chicago Daily News); and Don Whitehead (AP), for their reporting of the Korean War.
- Editorial Writing:
  - William Harry Fitzpatrick of the New Orleans States, for his series of editorials analyzing and clarifying a very important constitutional issue, which is described by the general heading of the series, "Government by Treaty".
- Editorial Cartooning:
  - Reg Manning of The Arizona Republic, for "Hats".
- Photography:
  - Max Desfor of the Associated Press, for his photographic coverage of the Korean War, an outstanding example of which is, "Flight of Refugees Across Wrecked Bridge in Korea".
- Special Citations:
  - Cyrus L. Sulzberger of The New York Times, for his exclusive interview with Archbishop Aloysius Stepinac.
  - Arthur Krock of The New York Times, for his exclusive interview with President Truman. As a member of the Advisory Board of the Pulitzer Prizes, Krock was ineligible for a prize, under the Board's policy. His interview was cited as the outstanding example of national reporting for the year, in lieu of awarding the National Reporting prize to anyone.

== Letters, Drama and Music Awards ==
- Fiction:
  - The Town by Conrad Richter (Knopf).
- Drama:
  - No award given.
- History:
  - The Old Northwest, Pioneer Period 1815–1840 by R. Carlyle Buley (Indiana Univ. Press).
- Biography or Autobiography:
  - John C. Calhoun: American Portrait by Margaret Coit (Houghton).
- Poetry:
  - Complete Poems by Carl Sandburg (Harcourt).
- Music:
  - Music in Giants in the Earth by Douglas Moore (Circle Blue), produced by Columbia Opera Workshop, March 28, 1951.
