= Max Desfor =

American photographer (1913–2018)

- Born: November 8, 1913; The Bronx, New York
- Died: February 19, 2018 (aged 104); Silver Spring, Maryland
- Occupation: Photographer
- Known for: Flight of Refugees Across Wrecked Bridge in Korea photograph
- Spouses: Clara Mehl (m. 1936; died 1994); Shirley Belasco (m. 2012; died 2015)
- Children: 1
- Awards: Pulitzer Prize

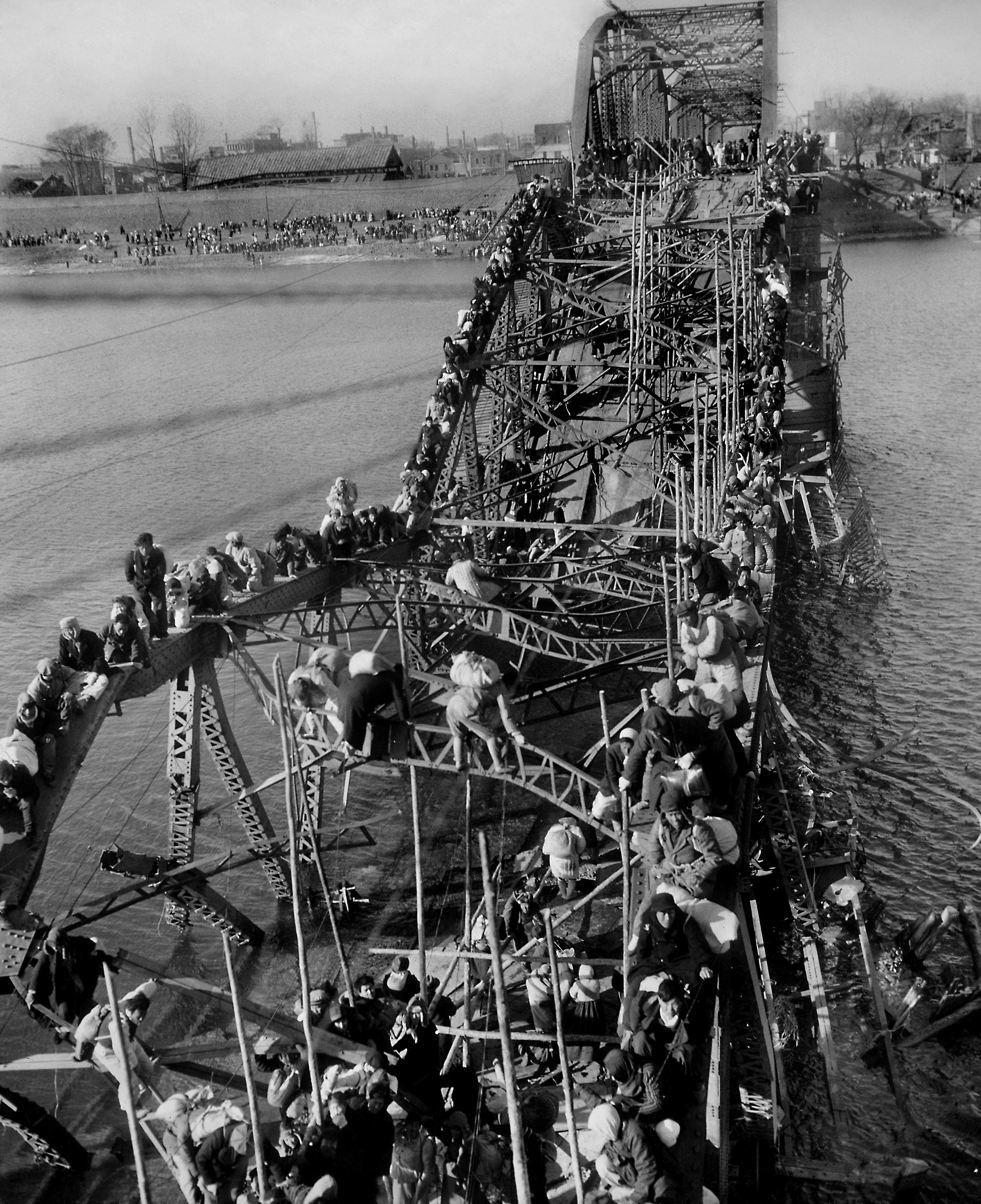
Flight of Refugees Across Wrecked Bridge in Korea, Pulitzer Prize-winning photo by Max Desfor

Max Desfor (November 8, 1913 – February 19, 2018) was an American photographer who received the Pulitzer Prize for his Korean War photograph, Flight of Refugees Across Wrecked Bridge in Korea, depicting Pyongyang residents and refugees crawling over a destroyed bridge across the Taedong River to escape the advancing Chinese Communist troops.

== Background ==
Desfor was born on November 8, 1913, in The Bronx, New York, the son of Jewish emigrants, his father from Russia and his mother from the Austro-Hungarian Empire. After graduating New Utrecht High School, he attended Brooklyn College for only a year then quit. He began working as a messenger with the Associated Press (AP), where his brother was a photo retoucher. Desfor taught himself photography basics and was hired as a staff photographer in 1938. Initially based in Baltimore, he moved to the Washington, D.C., bureau a year later.

== Career ==
Soon after the United States entered World War II, Desfor tried to enlist in the Navy but was denied because of his age and his being his family's sole source of income. He then became a wire service war photographer assigned to the staff of Admiral Chester W. Nimitz's Pacific fleet. In August 1945, Desfor photographed the Enola Gay's crew upon their Saipan landing after dropping the atomic bomb on Hiroshima. He was also present to photograph Japan's official surrender aboard the USS Missouri on September 2, 1945.

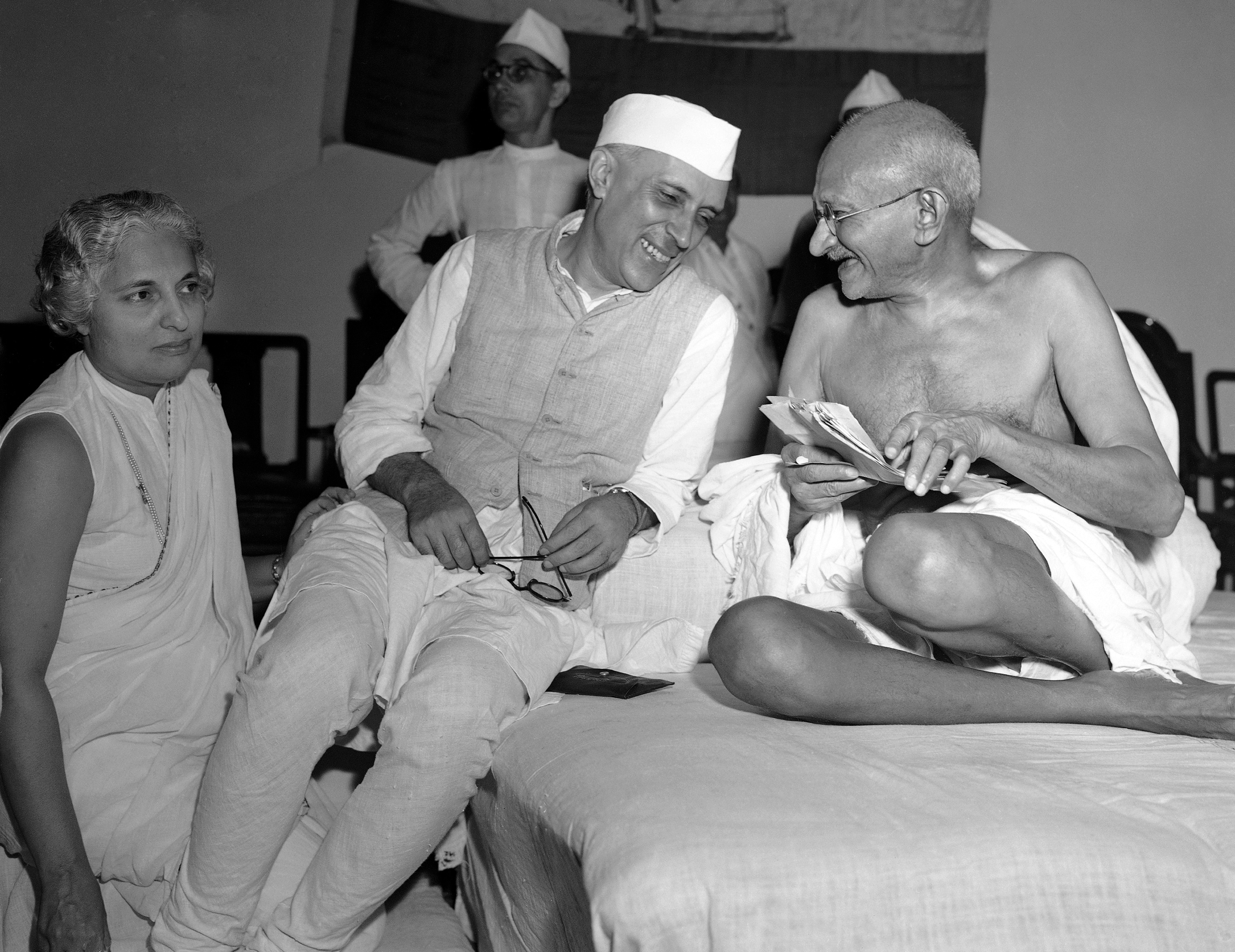
Jawaharlal Nehru and Mahatma Gandhi in a 1946 photo taken by Max Desfor.

A year later, Desfor was working for the AP in India and photographed Mahatma Gandhi and Jawaharlal Nehru attending an All India Congress Committee meeting. Following Gandhi's assassination in 1948, Desfor covered the funeral.

In 1950, covering the Korean War for the AP, he took the photograph that would earn him the Pulitzer Prize, Flight of Refugees Across Wrecked Bridge in Korea. "All of these people who are literally crawling through these broken-down girders of the bridge," he said, "they were in and out of it, on top, underneath, and just barely escaping the freezing water."

Desfor later became supervising editor of the AP's photo service and returned to Asia in 1968 as regional photo chief. He retired from the AP in 1978, then moved to the DC area to join the U.S. News & World Report as photo director. He retired six years later.

== Personal life ==
Desfor was married to Clara Mehl from 1936 until her death in 1994 from injuries sustained in a car accident. In 2012, at age 98, he married Shirley Belasco. Desfor died at his Silver Spring, Maryland, home on February 19, 2018, at age 104. His survivors include a son from his first marriage.
